= List of World Series of Poker Main Event champions =

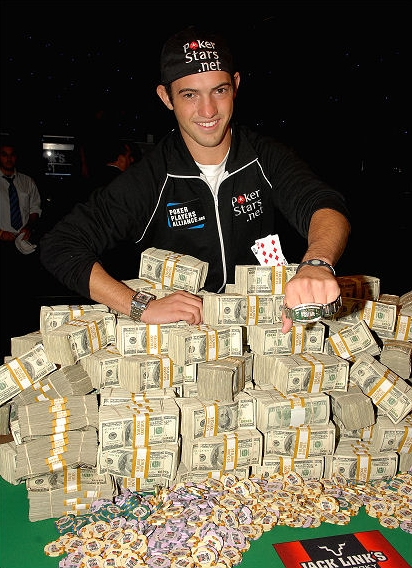
Joe Cada won the WSOP Main Event in 2009.

The World Series of Poker (WSOP) is "the oldest, largest, most prestigious, and most media-hyped gaming competition in the world". It has been held annually since 1970 in Las Vegas. Since 1972, the Main Event of the WSOP has been the $10,000 buy-in no-limit Texas Hold 'Em tournament. The winner of the WSOP Main Event receives a World Series of Poker bracelet, millions of dollars (with the exact amount based on the number of entrants), and the right to be considered the year's World Champion of Poker. From 2008 to 2016, the nine players who made it to the final table of the Main Event were called the November Nine, a reference to the fact that the final table was completed in November, months after the Main Event's preliminary rounds were completed.

Until 2005, the WSOP was held at Binion's Horseshoe. In 2005, the event moved to the Rio All Suite Hotel and Casino. The 2005 Main Event was not played completely at the Rio. The final three tables, which comprised the final 27 players, played the conclusion of the event at Binion's Horseshoe. All the Main Events that followed the 2005 event were played completely at the Rio through 2019, as well as in 2021. Consequently, this made Joe Hachem the final player to win the Main Event at the original home of the World Series of Poker.

== Milestones ==
Johnny Moss was the first person to win the WSOP. Since then only Moss and Stu Ungar have won the Main Event three times; Ungar is the only one to have won three times in the freeze-out format. Moss, Ungar, Doyle Brunson and Johnny Chan are the only people who have won the Main Event two years in a row. Johnny Chan's second victory in 1988 was featured on the 1998 film Rounders. Peter Eastgate was the youngest person to win the Main Event when he won it in 2008, at 22 years of age. He held that record for one year, when 21-year-old Joe Cada became the youngest Main Event champion.

== World Series of Poker Main Event ==
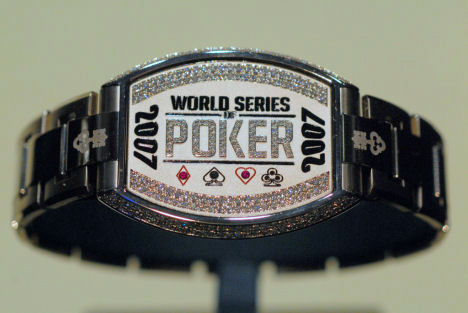
The 2007 Main Event WSOP Bracelet

	Elected to the Poker Hall of Fame.
†	Denotes player who is deceased.
Hand	The two hole cards the winner held on the final hand.
Prize (US$)	WSOP Main Event prize money.
Entrants	The number of players in that year's Main Event.
Winnings	Lifetime winnings in WSOP and WSOP Circuit events as of April 15, 2013.
Bracelets	WSOP victories are counted in terms of bracelets, as of April 15, 2013.

Image	Year	Winner	Nickname	Hand	Prize (US$)	Entrants	Total tournament earnings (US$)	WSOP bracelets	Runner-up	Ref.
	1970 (Note: The first World Series of Poker was not a freeze out tournament, but rather a game with a set start and stop time. Benny Binion took a secret ballot that asked the players who the best player was. According to poker lore, everybody said that they were the best player. Binion then asked who the second-best player was, and Johnny Moss won.)	Johnny Moss†	The Grand Old Man of Poker	—N/a	—N/a	7	824,922	9	N/A	
	1971	Johnny Moss†	The Grand Old Man of Poker	6♣ 6♠	30,000	6	824,922	9	Jack Straus†	
	1972	Thomas Preston†	Amarillo Slim	K♥ J♦	80,000	8	436,055	4	Walter Pearson†	
	1973	Walter Pearson†	Puggy	A♠ 7♠	130,000	13	245,740	4	Johnny Moss†	
	1974	Johnny Moss†	The Grand Old Man of Poker	3♥ 3♠	160,000	16	824,922	9	Crandell Addington†	
	1975	Brian Roberts†	Sailor	J♠ J♥	210,000	21	266,650	2	Bob Hooks	
	1976	Doyle Brunson†	Texas Dolly (Note: Doyle Brunson obtained the nickname of Texas Dolly when Jimmy The Greek mispronounced his name.)	10♠ 2♠	220,000	22	2,808,945	10	Jesse Alto†	
	1977	Doyle Brunson†	Texas Dolly	10♠ 2♥	340,000	34	2,808,945	10	Gary Berland†	
	1978	Bobby Baldwin	The Owl	Q♦ Q♣	210,000	42	604,900	4	Crandell Addington†	
	1979	Hal Fowler†	—	7♠ 6♦	270,000	54	270,000	1	Bobby Hoff†	
	1980	Stu Ungar†	Stuey or The Kid	5♠ 4♠	365,000	73	2,078,838	5	Doyle Brunson†	
	1981	Stu Ungar†	Stuey or The Kid	A♥ Q♥	375,000	75	2,078,838	5	Perry Green	
	1982	Jack Straus (Note: Jack Straus' 1982 WSOP tournament victory is considered to be one of the greatest comebacks in poker history. At one point, Straus was down to one chip, and he came back to win. This victory is considered the origin of the poker saying, "A chip and a chair." A saying that means that as long as you have a chip and a chair you have a chance. Modern lore indicates that this happened at the final table, but the 1983 book The Biggest Game in Town implies this occurred on the first day of the tournament.)†	Treetop	A♥ 10♠	520,000	104	555,000	2	Dewey Tomko	
	1983	Tom McEvoy	Grand Rapids Tom	Q♦ Q♠	540,000	108	1,291,031	4	Rod Peate	
—N/a	1984	Jack Keller†	Gentleman	10♥ 10♠	660,000	132	2,048,763	3	Byron Wolford†	
—N/a	1985	Bill Smith†	—	3♠ 3♥	700,000	140	788,000	1	T.J. Cloutier	
	1986	Berry Johnston	—	A♠ 10♥	570,000	141	2,265,523	5	Mike Harthcock	
	1987	Johnny Chan	Orient Express	A♠ 9♣	625,000	152	4,397,749	10	Frank Henderson	
	1988	Johnny Chan	Orient Express	J♣ 9♣	700,000	167	4,397,749	10	Erik Seidel	
	1989	Phil Hellmuth	The Poker Brat	9♠ 9♣	755,000	178	14,612,213	17	Johnny Chan	
—N/a	1990	Mansour Matloubi	—	6♥ 6♠	835,000	194	6,019,630	1	Hans Lund†	
	1991	Brad Daugherty	—	K♠ J♠	1,000,000	215	1,165,170	1	Don Holt	
	1992	Hamid Dastmalchi	—	8♥ 4♣	1,000,000	201	1,642,463	3	Tom Jacobs	
	1993	Jim Bechtel	—	J♠ 6♠	1,000,000	231	1,944,623	2	Glenn Cozen	
	1994	Russ Hamilton	—	K♠ 8♥	1,000,000	268	1,261,940	1	Hugh Vincent	
	1995	Dan Harrington	Action Dan	9♦ 8♦	1,000,000	273	3,491,513	2	Howard Goldfarb	
	1996	Huck Seed	—	9♦ 8♦	1,000,000	295	2,426,842	4	Bruce Van Horn	
	1997	Stu Ungar†	Stuey or The Kid	A♥ 4♣	1,000,000	312	2,078,838	5	John Strzemp	
	1998	Scotty Nguyen	The Train or The Prince of Poker	J♦ 9♣	1,000,000	350	5,895,732	5	Kevin McBride	
	1999	Noel Furlong†	—	5♣ 5♦	1,000,000	393	1,070,785	1	Alan Goehring	
	2000	Chris Ferguson	Jesus	A♠ 9♣	1,500,000	512	5,033,593	6	T.J. Cloutier	
	2001	Carlos Mortensen	El Matador	K♣ Q♣	1,500,000	613	3,168,216	2	Dewey Tomko	
	2002	Robert Varkonyi	—	Q♦ 10♠	2,000,000	631	2,110,212	1	Julian Gardner	
	2003	Chris Moneymaker (Note: Chris Moneymaker won the entry into the WSOP Main Event via a $86 online satellite.)	—	5♦ 4♠	2,500,000	839	2,532,041	1	Sam Farha	
	2004	Greg Raymer	Fossilman	8♠ 8♦	5,000,000	2,576	6,669,417	1	David Williams	
	2005	Joe Hachem (Note: In recent years, the prize pool for the WSOP Main Event has become so large that the winner instantly becomes one of the top money winners in tournament poker. Jamie Gold (2006) is number eight on that list, Joe Hachem (2005) is number ten, and Peter Eastgate (2008) is number eleven.)	—	7♣ 3♠	7,500,000	5,619	8,261,859	1	Steve Dannenmann	
	2006	Jamie Gold	—	Q♠ 9♣	12,000,000	8,773	12,067,292	1	Paul Wasicka	
	2007	Jerry Yang	The Shadow	8♦ 8♣	8,250,000	6,358	8,280,913	1	Tuan Lam	
	2008	Peter Eastgate	Isser	A♦ 5♠	9,152,416	6,844	9,430,506	1	Ivan Demidov	
	2009	Joe Cada (Note: Joe Cada is the youngest person to have won the WSOP Main Event.)	—	9♦ 9♣	8,547,044	6,494	10,339,448	4	Darvin Moon†	
	2010	Jonathan Duhamel	—	A♠ J♥	8,944,310	7,319	14,612,213	3	John Racener	
	2011	Pius Heinz	MastaP89	A♠ K♣	8,715,638	6,865	8,821,056	1	Martin Staszko	
	2012	Greg Merson	—	K♦ 5♦	8,531,853	6,598	10,174,029	2	Jesse Sylvia	
	2013	Ryan Riess	Riess the Beast	A♥ K♥	8,361,570	6,352	8,920,672	1	Jay Farber	
	2014	Martin Jacobson	NosbocajM	10♥ 10♦	10,000,000	6,683	12,102,232	1	Felix Stephensen	
	2015	Joe McKeehen	—	A♥ 10♦	7,683,346	6,420	10,480,861	3	Joshua Beckley	
	2016	Qui Nguyen	Tommy Gun	K♣ 10♣	8,005,310	6,737	8,022,287	1	Gordon Vayo	
	2017	Scott Blumstein	—	A♥ 2♦	8,150,000	7,221	8,155,227	1	Dan Ott	
	2018	John Cynn	—	K♣ J♣	8,800,000	7,874	9,513,071	1	Tony Miles	
—N/a	2019	Hossein Ensan	—	K♥ K♣	10,000,000	8,569	10,233,973	1	Dario Sammartino	
	2020	Damian Salas	—	K♦ J♠	2,550,969	1,379	5,553,433	1	Brunno Botteon	
	2021	Koray Aldemir	—	10♦ 7♦	8,000,000	6,650	20,334,110	1	George Holmes	
—N/a	2022	Espen Jørstad	—	Q♦ 2♠	10,000,000	8,663	10,271,872	2	Adrian Attenborough	
	2023	Daniel Weinman	—	K♣ J♦	12,100,000	10,043	11,478,432	2	Steven Jones	
—N/a	2024	Jonathan Tamayo	The Wizard	8♦ 3♠	10,000,000	10,112	14,255,111	1	Jordan Griff	
	2025	Michael Mizrachi	The Grinder	10♣ 3♣	10,000,000	9,735	29,013,562	8	John Wasnock	
—N/a	2026	Lucas Jumalon	—	K♠ 6♦	10,000,000	9,208	10,180,888	1	Lauri Sääskilahti	

=== World Series of Poker Europe Main Event ===
The World Series of Poker Europe (WSOPE) is the first expansion effort of World Series of Poker-branded poker tournaments outside the United States. Since 1970, the bracelet events have occurred every year in Las Vegas. The inaugural WSOPE, held in 2007, marked the first time that a WSOP bracelet was awarded outside Las Vegas. The 2007 Main Event, a GBP 10,000 buy-in no-limit hold 'em tournament, was won by Norwegian player Annette Obrestad on the day before her 19th birthday. This made her the youngest person to win a WSOP bracelet, a record that cannot be broken in the Las Vegas WSOP under current laws because the minimum legal age for casino gaming in Nevada is 21. Obrestad could play in the WSOPE because the minimum age for casino gaming in the United Kingdom is 18. The World Series of Poker Europe has a unique identity from the Las Vegas WSOP, but according to Harrah's will remain true to the traditions and heritage. The 2011 WSOP Europe main event was an 8-handed event.

Image	Year	Winner	Nickname	Hand	Prize	Entrants	Total tournament earnings	WSOP bracelets	Runner-up	Ref.
	2007	Annette Obrestad (Note: Annette Obrestad won the WSOPE at the age of 18 years, 364 days, making her the youngest person to have won a WSOP bracelet. She is also the first woman to have won a Main Event tournament and in 2007 was considered to be one of the best online multi-table tournament players in the world.)	Annette_15	7♥ 7♠	£1,000,000	362	$2,086,437	1	John Tabatabai	
	2008 (Note: The final table at the 2008 WSOPE Main Event was the longest final table in the WSOP history. It lasted 22 hours (a WSOP record) and 434 hands (a WSOP record).)	John Juanda	JJ or Luckbox	K♠ 6♣	£868,800	362	$4,825,816	5	Stanislav Alekhin	
	2009	Barry Shulman	—	10♠ 10♣	£801,603	334	—	2	Daniel Negreanu	
—N/a	2010	James Bord	—	10♦ 10♥	£830,401	346	—	1	Fabrizio Baldassari	
	2011	Elio Fox	smokrockflock	A♦ 10♠	€1,400,000	593	—	1	Chris Moorman	
	2012	Phil Hellmuth (Note: At the 2012 World Series of Poker Europe Main Event, Hellmuth won his record-breaking 13th bracelet. This also made him the first player ever to win the Main Events at both the WSOP and WSOPE. Hellmuth also holds the records for most WSOP cashes (100) and most WSOP final tables (53).)	The Poker Brat	A♥ 10♦	€1,022,376	420	$14,026,167	17	Sergii Baranov	
	2013	Adrián Mateos	Amadi_017	A♠ K♣	£1,000,000	375	$5,010,189	1	Fabrice Soulier	
—N/a	2015	Kevin MacPhee	ImaLuckSac	A♦ 4♦	£883,000	313	$5,456,298	2	David Lopez	
	2017	Marti Roca de Torres	Iquinze	Q♥ 5♦	€1,115,207	529	$1,295,566	1	Gianluca Speranza	
—N/a	2018	Jack Sinclair	Swaggersorus	Q♥ 9♣	€1,122,239	534	$3,393,632	1	Laszlo Bujtas	
	2019	Alexandros Kolonias	mexican222	A♠ K♠	€1,133,678	541	$1,469,612	1	Claas Segebrecht	
—N/a	2021	Josef Gulas Jr		A♦ 8♠	€1,276,712	688			Johan Guilbert	
—N/a	2022	Omar Eljach		Q♠ Q♦	€1,380,128	763			Jonathan Pastore	
—N/a	2023	Max Neugebauer		J♠ 8♣	€1,500,000	817			Eric Tsai	
—N/a	2024	Simone Andrian		10♥ 10♣	€1,300,000	768			Urmo Velvelt	
—N/a	2025	Daniel Pidun		A♣ A♥	€1,140,000	659			Gerald Karlic	
—N/a	2026	Marius Kudzmanas		7♦ 6♣	€2,000,000	2,617			Akihiro Konishi	

=== World Series of Poker Asia Pacific Main Event ===
The World Series of Poker Asia Pacific (WSOP APAC) is the most recent expansion of World Series of Poker-branded tournaments outside the United States. On April 30, 2012, WSOP owner Caesars Entertainment and Australian casino Crown Melbourne announced that the first WSOP APAC would be launched with five bracelet events in April 2013.

Image	Year	Winner	Nickname	Hand	Prize (A$)	Entrants	Total tournament earnings (US$)	WSOP bracelets	Runner-up	Ref.
	2013	Daniel Negreanu	Kid Poker	2♠ 2♥	1,038,825	405	16,346,486	6	Daniel Marton	
	2014	Scott Davies	Big Papi	6♦ 6♠	850,136	329	1,653,593	1	Jack Salter	

=== World Series of Poker Online Main Event ===
Due to the COVID-19 pandemic, in 2020 the World Series of Poker held an online poker series.

Image	Year	Winner	Nickname	Hand	Prize (US$)	Entrants	Total tournament earnings (US$)	WSOP bracelets	Runner-up	Ref.
	2020 (Note: The Unlawful Internet Gambling Enforcement Act of 2006 curtailed online gambling in the United States.)	Stoyan Madanzhiev	—	7♦ 6♥	3,904,686	5,802	3,935,954	1	Wenling Gao	
	2021	Aleksei Vandyshev	—		2,543,073	4,092			Edson Tsutsumi	
	2022	Simon Eric Mattsson	—		2,793,574	4,984			Kannapong Thanarattrakul	
	2023	Bert Stevens	Girafganger7		2,783,433	5,742			Yagen Li	
	2024	Moritz Dietrich			4,021,012	6,146			Evgenii Akimov	
	2025	Benjamin Rolle			3,900,707	5,961			Anatoly Zlotnikov	

== Players with multiple WSOP Main Event Final Table appearances ==
This is a list of players who have reached the Final Table at the WSOP Main Event at least twice. Does not include results from WSOP Europe, WSOP Asia Pacific or WSOP Online.

Elected to the Poker Hall of Fame.

Player	Championships	Final Tables	Years/Finish
Jesse Alto	0	8	1974 (4th), 1975 (6th), 1976 (2nd), 1978 (5th), 1984 (3rd), 1985 (6th), 1986 (4th), 1988 (9th)
Johnny Moss	3	7	1970, 1971 (1st), 1972 (6th), 1973 (2nd), 1974 (1st), 1979 (5th), 1980 (4th), 1985 (7th)
Doyle Brunson	2	7	1971 (3rd), 1972 (3rd), 1976 (1st), 1977 (1st), 1980 (2nd), 1982 (4th), 1983 (3rd)
Crandell Addington	0	7	1972 (4th), 1973 (9th), 1974 (2nd), 1975 (3rd), 1976 (4th), 1978 (2nd), 1979 (7th)
Sailor Roberts	1	6	1971 (6th), 1973 (6th), 1974 (3rd), 1975 (1st), 1977 (5th), 1982 (8th)
Stu Ungar	3	4	1980 (1st), 1981 (1st), 1990 (9th), 1997 (1st)
Johnny Chan	2	4	1987 (1st), 1988 (1st), 1989 (2nd), 1992 (7th)
Dan Harrington	1	4	1987 (6th), 1995 (1st), 2003 (3rd), 2004 (4th)
Berry Johnston	1	4	1982 (3rd), 1985 (3rd), 1986 (1st), 1990 (5th)
Jack Straus	1	4	1971 (2nd), 1972 (5th), 1973 (3rd),1982 (1st)
T.J. Cloutier	0	4	1985 (2nd), 1988 (5th), 1998 (3rd), 2000 (2nd)
Bob Hooks	0	4	1973 (5th), 1974 (6th), 1975 (2nd), 1976 (5th)
Hamid Dastmalchi	1	3	1985 (5th), 1992 (1st), 1995 (4th)
Jack Keller	1	3	1984 (1st), 1987 (9th), 1992 (8th)
Puggy Pearson	1	3	1971 (5th), 1972 (2nd), 1973 (1st)
Bill Smith	1	3	1981 (5th), 1985 (1st), 1986 (5th)
John Bonetti	0	3	1990 (8th), 1990 (3rd), 1996 (3rd)
Jimmy Casella	0	3	1971 (4th), 1972 (8th), 1973 (7th)
Al Krux	0	3	1990 (6th), 1994 (5th), 2004 (6th)
Steve Lott	0	3	1986 (7th), 1989 (4th), 1994 (9th)
Bobby Baldwin	1	2	1978 (1st), 1981 (7th)
Jim Bechtel	1	2	1988 (6th), 1993 (1st)
Joe Cada	1	2	2009 (1st), 2018 (5th)
Brad Daugherty	1	2	1991 (1st), 1993 (9th)
Noel Furlong	1	2	1989 (6th), 1999 (1st)
Phil Hellmuth	1	2	1989 (1st), 2001 (5th)
Mansour Matloubi	1	2	1990 (1st), 1993 (4th)
Michael Mizrachi	1	2	2010 (5th), 2025 (1st)
Damian Salas	1	2	2017 (7th), 2020 (1st)
Huck Seed	1	2	1996 (1st), 1999 (6th)
Mickey Appleman	0	2	1987 (8th), 2000 (9th)
Gary Berland	0	2	1977 (2nd), 1986 (3rd)
Dave Crunkleton	0	2	1990 (3rd), 1992 (5th)
Fernando Fisdel	0	2	1989 (7th), 1996 (8th)
Tom Franklin	0	2	1995 (7th), 2000 (8th)
Perry Green	0	2	1981 (2nd), 1991 (5th)
Kenny Hallaert	0	2	2016 (6th), 2025 (4th)
Jay Heimowitz	0	2	1980 (3rd), 1981 (6th)
Bobby Hoff	0	2	1973 (10th), 1979 (2nd)
George Huber	0	2	1979 (3rd), 1983 (9th)
Tom Jacobs	0	2	1986 (9th), 1992 (2nd)
Ben Lamb	0	2	2011 (3rd), 2017 (9th)
Hans Lund	0	2	1990 (2nd), 1992 (3rd)
Mike Matusow	0	2	2001 (6th), 2005 (9th)
Sam Moon	0	2	1979 (4th), 1981 (9th)
Mark Newhouse	0	2	2013 (9th), 2014 (9th)
Donnacha O'Dea	0	2	1983 (6th), 1991 (9th)
Rod Peate	0	2	1983 (2nd), 1990 (7th)
Sam Petrillo	0	2	1979 (8th), 1981 (8th)
Antoine Saout	0	2	2009 (3rd), 2017 (5th)
Jeff Shulman	0	2	2000 (7th), 2009 (5th)
Erik Seidel	0	2	1988 (2nd), 1999 (4th)
Ken Smith	0	2	1978 (6th), 1981 (4th)
Dewey Tomko	0	2	1982 (2nd), 2001 (2nd)
Roger Van Ausdall	0	2	1972 (7th), 1973 (8th)
