= Poker Hall of Fame =

Hall of Fame of professional poker

- Industry: Poker
- Founded: 1979
- Founder: Binion's Horseshoe
- Headquarters: Horseshoe Las Vegas
- Key people: Jack Binion, Creator
- Owner: Caesars Entertainment
- Website: Hall of Fame

The Poker Hall of Fame is the hall of fame of professional poker in the United States. Founded in Las Vegas, it was created in 1979 by Benny Binion, the owner of the Horseshoe Casino, to preserve the names and legacies of the world's greatest poker players and to serve as a tourist attraction to his casino.

Binion was known for the creative ways in which he marketed his casino. In 1949, he convinced Johnny Moss and Nick "The Greek" Dandolos to play high-stakes poker heads up where the public could watch them. In 1970, he invited a group of poker players to compete in what would be the first World Series of Poker (WSOP). When Harrah's Entertainment, later known as Caesars Entertainment, acquired the rights to the WSOP in 2004, it also assumed ownership of the Poker Hall of Fame. Currently, membership in the Poker Hall of Fame is handled directly by the WSOP.

As of 2026, 64 people have been inducted into the Poker Hall of Fame, 33 of whom are still living.

In July 2023, an exhibit devoted to the Poker Hall of Fame opened in the Horseshoe Las Vegas, owned by Caesar’s Entertainment. The exhibit acknowledges poker’s most legendary players with a Gallery of Champions, WSOP bracelets and rings.

== Requirements ==
Before the 2009 World Series of Poker, then-WSOP Commissioner Jeffrey Pollack announced that the process for becoming a member into the Poker Hall of Fame would undergo a slight modification. Starting in 2009, the Poker Hall of Fame started accepting nominations from the public. This move was intended to increase interest in the Hall. Almost immediately after this decision was announced, Party Poker started an online campaign to get its representative and World Poker Tour commentator Mike Sexton elected to the Hall. Other poker sites, namely PokerStars' Tom McEvoy, followed suit by pushing their own poker professionals. The requirements for the Poker Hall of Fame are as follows:

- A gambler must have played poker against acknowledged top competition,
- Played for high stakes,
- Played consistently well, gained the respect of peers,
- And stood the test of time.
- Or, for non-players, contributed to the overall growth and success of the game of poker, with indelible positive and lasting results.

In 2009, 23-year-old online poker professional Tom Dwan was a finalist for the Poker Hall of Fame because of public balloting. As a result, a new age requirement was added in 2011. This rule, known as the "Chip Reese Rule", established a minimum age of 40 to be inducted into the Hall of Fame. This new requirement eliminated some players who were regular nominees over the previous years, such as Phil Ivey and Daniel Negreanu (both of whom were eventually inducted upon reaching the age threshold).

== Award ==
Admission into the Poker Hall of Fame is considered one of the greatest honors in poker. In his acceptance speech, T. J. Cloutier declared, "It's one of two things I've always wanted to win." Barbara Enright, the first woman inducted into the Hall, considers her induction to be a "lifetime achievement honor."

Before being acquired by Harrah's Casino, R.S. Owens & Company was commissioned to design an award for Poker Hall of Famers. The award was an eight-inch-tall piece of glass with a hand of cards sandblasted at the bottom, the winner's name, and the words "Poker Hall of Fame" in a circle. The circle had a gold emblem bonded to the glass and had the Binion's Horseshoe Casino logo in it. There was a gold plated base with three gold-plated stacks of chips.

== Membership ==
†	Denotes player who is deceased.

Image	Year	Nationality	Name Nickname	WSOP Winnings	WSOP bracelets	Notes
	1979	USA	Johnny Moss†; The Grand Old Man of Poker	$834,422	1970 World Series of Poker Championship; 1971 $5,000 No Limit Hold'em World Championship; 1971 Limit Ace to 5 Draw; 1974 $10,000 No Limit Hold'em World Championship; 1975 $1,000 Seven Card Stud; 1976 $500 Seven Card Stud; 1979 $5,000 Seven Card Stud; 1981 $1,000 Seven Card Stud Hi-Lo; 1988 $1,500 Ace to Five Draw	The first World Series of Poker was not a freeze-out tournament, but rather a game with a set start and stop time. Benny Binion took a secret ballot that asked the players who the best player was. According to poker lore, everybody said that they were the best player. Binion then asked who the second-best player was, and Johnny Moss won.
	1979	GRE	Nick Dandolos†; Nick the Greek	$0	None	According to poker lore, in the summer of 1949, in Nevada, Nick the Greek and Johnny Moss played in a five-month-long poker marathon at Binion's Horseshoe Casino. Nick the Greek reportedly lost about $2 million to Moss and on losing the final hand stood up and said, "Mr. Moss, I have to let you go." This heads-up match, which became a tourist attraction, is often cited as the earliest inspiration behind the World Series of Poker.
—	1979	USA	Felton McCorquodale†; Corky	$0	None	McCorquodale is credited with introducing the game of Texas Hold'em to Las Vegas in 1963.
—	1979	USA	Red Winn†	$0	None	—
—	1979	USA	Sid Wyman†	$0	None	Wyman was a noted poker player and owner of several Vegas casinos: Sands, Riviera, Royal Nevada and The Dunes.
	1979	USA	James Butler Hickok†; Wild Bill Hickok	$0	None	Hickok was one of the best-known poker players in the world before the 20th century. He is one of three Poker Hall of Famers to die while playing poker (along with Tom Abdo and Jack Straus). Legend has it that when he was shot in the back in 1876, he was holding two aces and two eights. The hand has since been called the dead man's hand.
	1979	GBR	Edmond Hoyle†	$0	None	After writing a book on the game of whist, the phrase "according to Hoyle" become synonymous in card games with following the rules.
—	1980	USA	Blondie Forbes†	$0	None	Forbes is credited with creating the game of Texas Hold'em.
—	1981	USA	Bill Boyd†	$80,000	1971 $10,000 Limit Five Card Stud; 1972 $10,000 Five Card Stud; 1973 $10,000 Limit Five Card Stud; 1974 $5,000 Five Card Stud	Boyd was the Director of Operations at the Golden Nugget from 1946 to 1982. Boyd is credited with establishing Robert Turner's game Omaha hold 'em as a casino staple.
—	1982	USA	Tom Abdo†	$0	None	Abdo is one of three Poker Hall of Famers to die while playing poker (along with Wild Bill Hickok and Jack Straus). He died from a heart attack. According to legend, after suffering the heart attack, he asked another player to count his chips and to save his seat.
—	1983	USA	Joe Bernstein†	$21,000	1973 $10,000 Limit Ace to Five Draw	—
—	1984	USA	Murph Harrold†	$0	None	—
—	1985	USA	Red Hodges†	$0	None	—
—	1986	USA	Henry Green†	$0	None	—
	1987	USA	Walter Clyde Pearson†; Puggy	$265,580	1971 Limit Seven Card Stud; 1973 $10,000 No Limit Hold'em World Championship; 1973 $1,000 No Limit Hold'em; 1973 $4,000 Limit Seven Card Stud	Pearson is credited with coming up with the concept of a freeze-out tournament.
	1988	USA	Doyle Brunson†; Texas Dolly	$2,994,116	1976 $10,000 No Limit Hold'em World Championship; 1977 $5,000 Deuce to Seven Draw; 1977 $10,000 No Limit Hold'em World Championship; 1977 $1,000 Seven Card Stud Split; 1978 $5,000 Seven Card Stud; 1979 $600 Mixed Doubles (with Starla Brodie); 1991 $2,500 No Limit Hold'em; 1998 $1,500 Seven Card Razz; 2003 $2,000 H.O.R.S.E. 2005 $5,000 No Limit Shorthanded Texas Hold'em	Brunson wrote Super/System, widely considered to be the most influential book ever written on poker.
	1988	USA	Jack Straus†; Treetop	$597,000	1973 $3,000 Deuce to Seven Draw; 1982 $10,000 Championship Event - No Limit Hold'em	Straus' 1982 WSOP tournament victory is considered to be one of the greatest comebacks in poker history. At one point, Straus had one chip remaining, and came back to win. This victory is considered to be the origin of the poker saying, "A chip and a chair", meaning that as long as a player has not been eliminated from the tournament, he or she still has a chance. Modern lore indicates that this happened at the final table, but the 1983 book The Biggest Game in Town implies this occurred on the first day of the tournament. Straus is one of three Hall of Famers to die while playing poker (along with Wild Bill Hickok and Tom Abdo).
—	1989	USA	Fred Ferris†; Sarge	$150,000	1980 $10,000 Deuce to Seven Draw	Ferris gained notoriety when the IRS seized $46,000 from him on April 22, 1983, while he was playing high-stakes poker at the Horseshoe.
	1990	USA	Benny Binion†	$0	None	Founder of the Horseshoe Casino and the WSOP
	1991	USA	David Reese†; Chip	$2,246,089	1978 $1,000 Seven Card Stud Split; 1982 $5,000 Limit 7 Card Stud; 2006 $50,000 H.O.R.S.E. World Championship	Despite winning three bracelets, Reese was best known for his cash-game play. At 40 years old, he was the youngest person to be enshirined in the Poker Hall of Fame.
	1992	USA	Thomas Preston†; Amarillo Slim	$437,958	1972 $10,000 No Limit Hold'em World Championship; 1974 $1,000 No Limit Hold'em; 1985 $5,000 Pot Limit Omaha; 1990 $5,000 Pot Limit Omaha	After winning the WSOP in 1972, Slim sought to change the image of poker by appearing on national television and radio programs. Slim hosted the Super Bowl of Poker, considered the second most prestigious tournament at the time.
—	1993	USA	Jack Keller†; Gentleman Jack Keller	$1,583,845	1984 $5,000 Seven Card Stud; 1984 $10,000 No Limit Hold'em World Championship; 1993 $1,500 Omaha Limit	—
—	1995	USA	Julius Oral Popwell†; Little Man	$0	None	—
—	1997	USA	Roger Moore†	$372,698	1994 $5,000 Limit 7 Card Stud	—
	2001	USA	Stu Ungar†; The Kid	$2,081,478	1980 $10,000 No Limit Hold'em World Championship; 1981 $10,000 No Limit Hold'em World Championship; 1981 $10,000 Deuce to Seven Draw; 1983 $5,000 Seven Card Stud; 1997 $10,000 No Limit Hold'em World Championship	Ungar won back-to-back WSOP Main Event bracelets in 1980 and 1981, and won the event again in 1997. He and Johnny Moss are the only players to have won the main event three times.
	2002	USA	Lyle Berman	$1,619,407	1989 $1,500 Limit Omaha; 1992 $2,500 No Limit Hold'em; 1994 $5,000 No Limit Deuce to Seven Draw	—
	2002	USA	Johnny Chan; Orient Express; The Great Wall of China	$4,635,014	1985 $1,000 Limit Hold'em; 1987 $10,000 No Limit Hold'em World Championship; 1988 $10,000 No Limit Hold'em World Championship; 1994 $1,500 Seven Card Stud; 1997 $5,000 Deuce to Seven Draw; 2000 $1,500 Pot Limit Omaha; 2002 $2,500 No Limit Hold'em Gold Bracelet Match Play; 2003 $5,000 No Limit Hold'em; 2003 $5,000 Pot Limit Omaha; 2005 $2,500 Pot Limit Hold'em	—
	2003	USA	Bobby Baldwin; The Owl	$2,100,311	1977 $5,000 Seven Card Stud; 1977 $10,000 Deuce to Seven Draw; 1978 $10,000 No Limit Hold'em World Championship; 1979 $10,000 Deuce to Seven Draw	Baldwin has worked with several casinos in various capacities due to his poker expertise.
	2004	USA	Berry Johnston	$2,116,110	1983 $2,500 Match Play; 1986 $10,000 No Limit Hold'em World Championship; 1990 $2,500 Limit Hold'em; 1995 $1,500 Limit Omaha; 2001 $1,500 Razz	At the time of his induction into the Hall of Fame, Johnston had the most WSOP cashes of any poker player. Having cashed in at least one event every year from 1982 to 2010, Berry holds the record for longest streaks at 29 years.
	2005	USA	Jack Binion	$0	None	Binion was the first host of the WSOP in 1970 and successor to the Horseshoe legacy after the death of his father, Benny Binion.
	2005	USA	Crandell Addington†; Dandy	$105,650	None	—
	2006	USA	T. J. Cloutier	$4,683,940	1987 $1,000 Limit Omaha Hi; 1994 $1,500 Limit Omaha 8 or Better; 1994 $2,500 Pot Limit Hold'em; 1998 $2,500 Pot Limit Omaha Hi; 2004 $1,500 Seven Card Razz; 2005 $5,000 No Limit Hold'em	Cloutier is the only person to have won bracelets in all three types (Pot Limit High, Limit High, and Limit 8-or-Better High-low split) of Omaha.
	2006	USA	Billy Baxter	$1,210,920	1975 $1,000 Deuce to Seven; 1978 $10,000 Deuce to Seven Draw; 1982 $10,000 Deuce to Seven Draw; 1982 $2,500 Ace to Five Draw; 1987 $5,000 Deuce to Seven Draw; 1993 $5,000 Deuce to Seven Draw; 2002 $1,500 Razz	In the case of Baxter v. United States, Baxter fought the Internal Revenue Service and won the right to count poker winnings as earned income. Because of the ruling, poker winnings are taxed at a lower rate than other forms of gambling.
	2007	USA	Barbara Enright	$457,544	1986 $500 Women's Seven Card Stud; 1994 $1,000 Women's Seven Card Stud; 1996 $2,500 Pot Limit Hold'em	Enright was the first woman to have advanced to the final table of the WSOP Main Event. She was the first woman to win three WSOP bracelets and the first to win an open event.
	2007	USA	Phil Hellmuth; The Poker Brat	$14,046,072	1989 $10,000 No Limit Hold'em World Championship; 1992 $5,000 Limit Hold'em; 1993 $1,500 No Limit Hold'em; 1993 $2,500 No Limit Hold'em; 1993 $5,000 Limit Hold'em; 1997 $3,000 Pot Limit Hold'em; 2001 $2,000 No Limit Hold'em; 2003 $2,500 Limit Hold'em; 2003 $3,000 No Limit Hold'em; 2006 $1,000 No Limit Hold'em with rebuys 2007 $1,500 No Limit Hold'em; 2012 $2,500 Seven Card Razz; 2012 $10,400 WSOPE Main Event; 2015 $10,000 Seven-Card Razz; 2018 $5,000 No Limit Hold'em; 2021 $1,500 No Limit 2-7 Lowball Draw; 2023 $10,000 Super Turbo Bounty No-Limit Hold'em	In 1989, at age 24, Hellmuth became the youngest person to win the WSOP main event. He held this distinction until 2008, when 22-year-old Peter Eastgate captured the title, and subsequently by 21-year-old Joe Cada in 2009. Hellmuth holds the records for most WSOP bracelets (17), WSOP cashes (186), and most WSOP final tables (64).
	2008	USA	Dewey Tomko	$2,725,128	1979 $1,000 No Limit Hold'em; 1984 $5,000 Pot Limit Omaha; 1984 $10,000 Deuce to Seven Draw	Tomko has won over $4.9 million in tournament poker. Tomko has played in every WSOP since 1974, the longest streak ever.
—	2008	POL	Henry Orenstein†	$232,519	1996 $5,000 Seven Card Stud	Orenstein is the patent holder of the hole cam, which allows audiences to see player's hole cards. At the time of his induction, he was a producer of Poker Superstars Invitational Tournament and High Stakes Poker.
	2009	USA	Mike Sexton†	$2,613,457	1989 $1,500 Seven Card Stud Split	Sexton has live tournament winnings in excess of $3 million. He has made 21 final tables at the WSOP, including a bracelet in Seven Card Stud 8/OB in 1989. Sexton has been a commentator on the World Poker Tour since season one.
	2010	USA	Dan Harrington; Action Dan	$3,534,237	1995 $2,500 No Limit Hold'em; 1995 $10,000 No Limit Hold'em World Championship	Harrington has co-authored the Harrington on Hold 'em and Harrington on Cash Games series of books. He is also the 1995 WSOP Main Event champion.
	2010	USA	Erik Seidel; Sly	$5,352,474	1992 $2,500 Limit Hold'em; 1993 $2,500 Omaha 8 or better 1994 $5,000 Limit Hold'em; 1998 $5,000 Deuce to Seven Draw; 2001 $3,000 No Limit Hold'em; 2003 $1,500 Pot Limit Omaha; 2005 $2,000 No Limit Hold'em; 2007 $5,000 World Championship No-Limit Deuce to Seven Draw Lowball w/rebuys 2021 O $10,000 Super Million$ High Roller	Seidel has captured nine WSOP bracelets. Seidel was runner-up in the 1988 World Series of Poker main event to Johnny Chan. The final hand was featured in the 1998 film, Rounders.
	2011	USA	Barry Greenstein; The Robin Hood of Poker	$3,159,631	2004 $5,000 No Limit Deuce to Seven Draw; 2005 $1,500 Pot Limit Omaha; 2008 $1,500 Razz	"The Robin Hood of Poker" is known for giving his tournament winnings to charities and a signed copy of his autobiography to any player who eliminates him from a tournament.
	2011	USA	Linda Johnson; The First Lady of Poker	$169,508	1997 $1,500 Seven Card Razz	"The First Lady of Poker" was a publisher of Card Player Magazine and was instrumental in the formation of the Tournament Director's Association (TDA). At the time of her election, she served on the TDA Board of Directors and was heavily involved with the World Poker Tour as both a public relations director and tournament announcer.
—	2012	USA	Eric Drache	$289,513	None	Drache was the World Series of Poker's tournament director (1973 to 1988). He is also credited with the concept of satellite tournaments.
	2012	USA	Bryan Roberts†; Sailor	$266,650	1974 $5,000 No-Limit Deuce to Seven Draw; 1975 $10,000 No Limit Hold'em World Championship.	Roberts was the winner of the 1975 WSOP Main Event.
	2013	USA	Tom McEvoy	$1,347,328	1983 $1,000 Limit Hold'em; 1983 $10,000 No Limit Hold'em World Championship; 1986 $1,000 Limit Razz; 1992 $1,500 Limit Omaha	McEvoy has won 4 WSOP bracelets, including the 1983 Main Event. He was the first player to win that event after earning a seat through a satellite. He has also written over a dozen books on poker. McEvoy was instrumental in the effort to have smoking banned in card rooms
	2013	VIE	Scotty Nguyen; The Prince of Poker	$5,355,271	1997 $2,000 Limit Omaha Hi-Lo; 1998 $10,000 No Limit Hold'em World Championship; 2001 $2,500 Pot Limit Omaha; 2001 $5,000 Limit Omaha Hi-Lo; 2008 $50,000 World Championship H.O.R.S.E.	Nguyen was the winner of the 1998 WSOP Main Event and the 2008 $50,000 H.O.R.S.E. Championship, the only player to win both titles. He has made 9 World Poker Tour final tables with one title, making him one of four players to have a WPT title and WSOP Main Event bracelet. Altogether, Nguyen has accumulated over $11,000,000 in tournament winnings.
	2014	USA	Jack McClelland	$107,396	None	McClelland has had a career in poker operations for more than forty years. He was the WSOP tournament director in the 1980s, and was the manager of the Bellagio poker room from 2002 to 2013.
	2014	CAN	Daniel Negreanu; Kid Poker	$22,005,911	1998 $2,000 Pot Limit Hold'em; 2003 $2,000 Limit S.H.O.E. 2004 $2,000 Limit Hold'em; 2008 $2,000 Limit Hold'em; 2013 WSOP APAC $10,000 No Limit Hold'em Main Event; 2013 WSOPE €25,600 High Roller No Limit Hold'em; 2024 $50,000 Poker Players Championship	Since turning professional at the age of 22, Negreanu has become one of the most successful and recognizable players in poker. He has won 8 WSOP bracelets, once occupied 1st place on the all-time WSOP money list, and is a 2-time WSOP Player of the Year winner. He has also won 2 WPT titles, was player of the year in season 3, and is 2nd on the WPT career money list. With total live tournament earnings of over $56 million, Negreanu has the third most career winnings in poker history. Global Poker Index named Negreanu the player of the decade from 2004 to 2013.
	2015	USA	Jennifer Harman	$1,477,156	2000 $5,000 No Limit Deuce to Seven Lowball; 2002 $5,000 Limit Hold'em	Harman was the first woman to win more than one WSOP bracelets in open events. She has made 12 WSOP final tables, two WPT final tables, and has nearly $2.8 million in live tournament winnings. A fixture at high stakes cash games, Harman is the only woman who regularly plays in the Big Game at the Bellagio.
	2015	IDN	John Juanda; JJ, Luckbox	$5,714,127	2002 $1,500 Limit Triple Draw; 2003 $2,500 Limit Seven Card Stud; 2003 $2,500 Pot Limit Omaha w/Rebuys; 2008 WSOPE £10,000 WSOP Europe Main Event; 2011 $10,000 2-7 Draw Lowball Championship	Juanda has over $25 million in tournament winnings, including 5 WSOP bracelets, an EPT title, and 6 WPT final tables.
	2016	USA	Todd Brunson	$1,827,862	2005 $2,500 Omaha Hi/Lo	—
	2016	ECU	Carlos Mortensen; El Matador	$3,242,868	2001 $10,000 No Limit Hold'em World Championship; 2003 $5,000 Limit Hold'em	Mortensen was the winner of the 2001 WSOP Main Event.
	2017	GBR	David Ulliott†; Devilfish	$1,708,075	1997 $2,000 Pot Limit Hold'em	—
	2017	USA	Phil Ivey; The Tiger Woods of Poker, No Home Jerome	$6,547,112	2000 $2,500 Pot-Limit Omaha; 2002 $1,500 Limit Seven Card Stud; 2002 $2,500 Limit Seven Card Stud Hi-Lo; 2002 $2,000 Limit S.H.O.E. 2005 $5,000 Pot-Limit Omaha; 2009 $2,500 No-Limit 2-7 Lowball Draw; 2009 $2,500 Omaha/Seven Card Stud Hi-Lo 8 or Better; 2010 $3,000 H.O.R.S.E. 2013 WSOP APAC $2,200 Mixed Event (8-Game); 2014 $1,500 8-Game Mix; 2024 $10,000 Limit 2-7 Lowball Triple Draw Championship	Ivey is 2nd in WSOP bracelet wins with 11, behind Phil Hellmuth (17). Ivey has won over $45 million in tournament play.
	2018	USA	Mori Eskandani	$245,319	None	Eskandani is the President of PokerGO after beginning his career as a television producer who has produced programs such as the World Series of Poker, Poker After Dark, and High Stakes Poker.
	2018	USA	John Hennigan; World	$5,532,732	2002 $2,000 Limit Seven Card Stud Hi-Lo; 2004 $5,000 Limit Hold'em; 2014 $50,000 Poker Players Championship; 2016 $10,000 Limit 2-7 Lowball Triple Draw Championship; 2018 $10,000 H.O.R.S.E. 2019 $10,000 Seven Card Stud	Hennigan has won six World Series of Poker bracelets, including the Poker Players Championship in 2014. He also won a World Poker Tour title in 2007. He has more than $8 million in tournament winnings, including $5.5 million at the WSOP.
	2019	USA	Chris Moneymaker	$2,552,930	2003 $10,000 No Limit Hold'em Main Event	Moneymaker's win at the 2003 WSOP Main Event, after earning his seat in a $86 online satellite, is often credited with beginning the poker boom.
	2019	USA	David Oppenheim	$1,110,786	None	Oppenheim is regarded as one of the best all-round cash game players in the world and can often be found playing in the biggest mixed games in Las Vegas.
	2020	USA	Huck Seed	$3,653,465	1994 $2,500 Pot Limit Omaha; 1996 $10,000 No Limit Hold'em Main Event; 2000 $1,500 Razz; 2003 $5,000 Razz	Seed is a four-time WSOP bracelet winner, including the 1996 Main Event. He also won the WSOP Tournament of Champions in 2010, and the National Heads-Up Poker Championship in 2009. He is also notorious for his numerous prop bets.
	2021	ISR	Eli Elezra	$2,636,538	2007 $3,000 World Championship Seven Card Stud Hi-Low; 2013 $2,500 2–7 Triple Draw Lowball (Limit); 2015 $1,500 Seven Card Stud; 2019 $1,500 Seven Card Stud; 2022 $10,000 Pot-Limit Omaha Hi-Lo 8 or Better Championship	Elezra has won five World Series of Poker bracelets, including three in Seven Card Stud variants. He also won a World Poker Tour title in 2004. Elezra has more than $4.6 million in tournament winnings, including $2.6 million at the WSOP.
	2022	USA	Layne Flack†; Back to Back	$2,869,570	1999 $3,000 Pot Limit Hold-Em; 2002 $2,000 No Limit Hold-Em; 2002 $1,500 No Limit Hold-Em; 2003 $2,500 Omaha Hi-Lo Split; 2003 $1,500 Limit Hold-Em Shootout; 2008 $1,500 Pot Limit Omaha w/Rebuys	Flack won six World Series of Poker bracelets, winning four of them within a two-year span. He also won a World Poker Tour title in 2003. Flack had more than $5 million in tournament winnings, including $2.8m at the WSOP.
	2023	USA	Brian Rast	$8,921,094	2011 $1,500 Pot-Limit Hold'em; 2011 $50,000 Poker Players Championship; 2016 $50,000 Poker Players Championship; 2018 $10,000 No-Limit 2-7 Lowball Draw Championship; 2021 $3,000 6-Handed No-Limit Hold'em; 2023 $50,000 Poker Players Championship	Rast won the prestigious $50,000 Poker Player's Championship three times and has won six WSOP bracelets in total.
	2024	FIN	Patrik Antonius	$1,002,516		Antonius is a cash game player and heads-up specialist who became one of the most recognizable faces in televised poker after first appearing on High Stakes Poker in 2007.
	2025	USA	Nick Schulman	$10,203,706	2009 $10,000 No-Limit 2-7 Lowball Draw Championship; 2012 $10,000 No-Limit 2-7 Lowball Draw Championship; 2019 $10,000 Pot-Limit Omaha Hi-Lo 8 or Better; 2023 $1,500 Seven Card Stud; 2024 $25,000 High Roller No-Limit Hold'em (8-Handed); 2024P $5,000 The Closer No-Limit Hold'em Bounty Turbo; 2025 $10,000 No-Limit 2-7 Lowball Draw Championship	
	2025	USA	Michael Mizrachi; The Grinder	$29,013,562	2010 $50,000 Poker Players Championship; 2011 WSOPE €10,400 Split-Format No-Limit Hold'em; 2012 $50,000 Poker Players Championship; 2018 $50,000 Poker Players Championship; 2019 $1,500 Seven-Card Stud Hi/Lo 8 or Better; 2024 WSOPO No-Limit Hold'em Crazy 8's Encore; 2025 $50,000 Poker Players Championship; 2025 $10,000 No Limit Hold'em Main Event	Mizrachi was inducted outside the normal voting process immediately after winning the 2025 Main Event, having become the first player ever to win the Poker Players Championship and Main Event in the same year. The Main Event win was his eighth total bracelet, including four in the Poker Players Championship.
	2026	USA	Jason Koon	$10,404,298	2021 $25,000 Heads-Up No-Limit Hold'em Championship; 2025 $50,000 No-Limit Hold'em High Roller	Elected in his first year of eligibility, Koon ranks third on the all-time money list with more than $77 million in live tournament earnings. He's won two WSOP bracelets and a record 12 Triton Poker Series titles.

== See also ==
- World Poker Tour Walk of Fame
