= Carl Cannon (poker player) =

American poker player

World Series of Poker
- Bracelet: None
- Money finish: 1
- Highest WSOP Main Event finish: 9th, 1982

Carl Cannon is a poker player, who participated in the first World Series of Poker in 1970.

For decades before the World Series of Poker came to Las Vegas, Cannon was considered to be one of the best poker players in the United States. Cannon competed for decades and gained notoriety among some of the poker legends of the era.

Jack Binion, host of the World Series of Poker, invited the best seven poker players in the United States to his Binion's Horseshoe casino in Las Vegas, Nevada to decide who was the best poker player in America. Unlike the WSOP events that followed it, which are decided using a freeze-out tournament, the 1970 champion was decided from a vote by the players.

Cannon was invited by Binion to take part in the 1970 event. The other six players invited to the 1970 Main Event were all legends of the game that already had or would go on to have great poker careers.

The other six players were:

- Crandell Addington, 1969 Texas Gamblers Reunion Champion and 1978 Main Event runner-up. Addington was described by Brunson as a No Limit Hold'em legend.
- Johnny Moss, eventual winner of the 1970 tournament, and winner of the 1971 and 1974 Main Events. Moss was already legendary in the poker circles of America before the World Series existed. Moss would go on to win a total of nine WSOP bracelets in his career.
- "Amarillo Slim" Preston, 1972 Main Event Champion. Preston would win a total of four WSOP bracelets in his career.
- Puggy Pearson, 1973 Main Event Champion. Pearson would finish his career with four WSOP bracelets.
- Sailor Roberts, 1975 Main Event Champion. Roberts would finish his career with two WSOP bracelets.
- Doyle Brunson, 1976 and 1977 Main Event Champion. Brunson would go on to win a total of ten WSOP bracelets and one World Poker Tour championship, which are among many accolades achieved during his legendary career.

Cannon was considered one of the best players in America along with the other six legends.

He would have one more notable finish in his tournament career after the 1970 Main Event. He finished in ninth place in the 1982 WSOP Main Event, which was won by poker professional Jack Straus.
