= 1973 World Series of Poker =

Series of poker tournaments

- Location: Binion's Horseshoe, Las Vegas, Nevada
- Dates: May 4 – 10

Champion
- (United States) Puggy Pearson

The 1973 World Series of Poker (WSOP) was a series of poker tournaments held at Binion's Horseshoe from May 4 to 10, 1973.

== Events ==
The 1973 WSOP had six preliminary events. The 1973 WSOP marked the first time a single player won more than one preliminary World Series of Poker event in a single series with Puggy Pearson winning twice. Event #4 marked the first time in WSOP history that two players were awarded the same title in Aubrey Day and Jack Straus. Both players received credit for the first-place finish. Event #5 has a record of showing a single entry, Bill Boyd. Boyd was automatically awarded the bracelet by documented sources. All details of Event #5 are currently unknown to dispute the claim.

#	Date	Event	Entries	Winner	Prize	Runner-up	Results
1	May 4, 1973	$4,000 Limit Seven-card stud	8	Puggy Pearson (1/2)	$28,000	Eric Drache	Results
2	May 5, 1973	$1,000 Limit Razz	32	Sam Angel (1/1)	$32,000	Unknown	Results
3	May 6, 1973	$3,000 Limit A-5 Draw Lowball	7	Joe Bernstein (1/1)	$21,000	Unknown	Results
4	May 7, 1973	$3,000 No Limit 2-7 Draw Lowball	11	Aubrey Day (1/1); Jack Straus (1/1)	$16,500 each	Unknown	Results
5	May 8, 1973	$10,000 No Limit Five-card stud	1*	Bill Boyd (1/3)	$10,000	None	Results
6	May 9, 1973	$1,000 Texas hold 'em	17	Puggy Pearson (2/3)	$17,000	Unknown	Results
7	May 10, 1973	$10,000 No Limit Hold'em Main Event	13	Puggy Pearson (3/4)	$130,000	Johnny Moss (0/3)	Results

== Main Event ==
There were 13 entrants to the winner-take-all Main Event. Pearson defeated Moss heads-up in a game that took around three hours. With Pearson's victory, he set a record with three bracelets won during a single World Series. Pearson's feat would not be matched again until the 1993 WSOP, when Phil Hellmuth and Ted Forrest captured three bracelets each. He became the first player to reach four career bracelets, although this Main Event would be his last bracelet.

=== Final Table ===
Name	Number of chips (percentage of total)	WSOP Bracelets	WSOP Cashes*	WSOP Earnings*
(United States) Puggy Pearson	35,450 (27.2%)	2	2	$55,000
(United States) Jack Straus	31,700 (24.3%)	1	1	$16,500
(United States) Crandell Addington	12,600 (9.6%)	0	0	0
(United States) Jimmy Casella	9,175 (7.0%)	1	1	$10,000
(United States) Sailor Roberts	8,900 (6.8%)	0	0	0
(United States) Johnny Moss	8,225 (6.3%)	3	3	$40,000
(United States) Bob Hooks	8,150 (6.3%)	0	0	0
(United States) Bobby Brazil	7,200 (5.5%)	0	0	0
(United States) Roger Van Ausdall	6,900 (5.3%)	0	0	0
(United States) Bobby Hoff	1,925 (1.5%)	0	0	0

*Career statistics prior to the Main Event

NB - Final Table chip counts added up to 130,225

=== Final table results ===
Place	Name	Prize
1st	Puggy Pearson	$130,000
2nd	Johnny Moss	None
3rd	Jack Straus	None
4th	Bobby Brazil	None
5th	Bob Hooks	None
6th	Sailor Roberts	None
7th	Jimmy Casella	None
8th	Roger Van Ausdall	None
9th	Crandell Addington	None
10th	Bobby Hoff	None

=== Other Finishes ===
Place	Name	Prize
11th	Doyle Brunson	None
12th	Amarillo Slim	None
13th	Sherman Lanier	None
