= Sam Angel =

American poker player (1920–2007)

- Born: November 30, 1920
- Died: March 21, 2007 (aged 86)

World Series of Poker
- Bracelets: 2
- Money finishes: 4
- Highest WSOP Main Event finish: None

Sam Angel (November 30, 1920 – March 21, 2007) was a poker player best known as a top Razz player and for his two wins at the World Series of Poker (WSOP).

At the 1973 World Series of Poker, Angel won the $1,000 buy-in WSOP Razz event, with its $32,000 prize and bracelet. In 1975, he won a second bracelet and $17,000 in the $1,000 buy-in Razz event.

Angel won a Razz event at the 1981 Super Bowl of Poker, organized by 1972 world champion Amarillo Slim. For this win, he received a prize of $57,000. He cashed in various other tournaments during his career, with tournament winnings over $180,000.

In the 1950s, Angel worked as a driver for Nick "The Greek" Dandalos and began playing poker during this time. He sold jewelry to raise money for his poker bankroll. Despite his poker tournament success, Angel was primarily a cash game player during much of his poker career.

Angel died on March 21, 2007.

== World Series of Poker Bracelets ==
Year	Tournament	Prize (US$)
1973	$1,000 Razz	$32,000
1975	$1,000 Razz	$17,000
