= Little Man Popwell =

American poker player (1912–1966)

- Born: June 1, 1912
- Died: May 19, 1966 (aged 53)
- Occupation: Poker player
- Awards: Poker Hall of Fame inductee (1996)

Julius Oral "Little Man" Popwell (June 1, 1912 – May 19, 1966) was an American poker player.

== Biography ==
Popwell is one of the most famous poker players from the first half of the 20th century. His preferred game was five card stud, and he often played against other poker legends such as Johnny Moss. He was posthumously inducted into the Poker Hall of Fame in 1996.

Despite his nickname, Popwell was obese, weighing over 300 pounds (136 kg) while standing 5'6" tall. The nickname "Little Man" actually came from his prowess in billiards when he was a teenager, because he could regularly beat men over twice his age.

He operated lotteries and card games from his home near Birmingham, Alabama, and on April 3, 1954, he was sentenced to 366 days in jail and fined $250 for this, as well as income tax evasion.
