= 1972 World Series of Poker =

Series of poker tournaments

- Location: Binion's Horseshoe, Las Vegas, Nevada
- Dates: May 7 & May 11, 1972

Champion
- (United States) Amarillo Slim

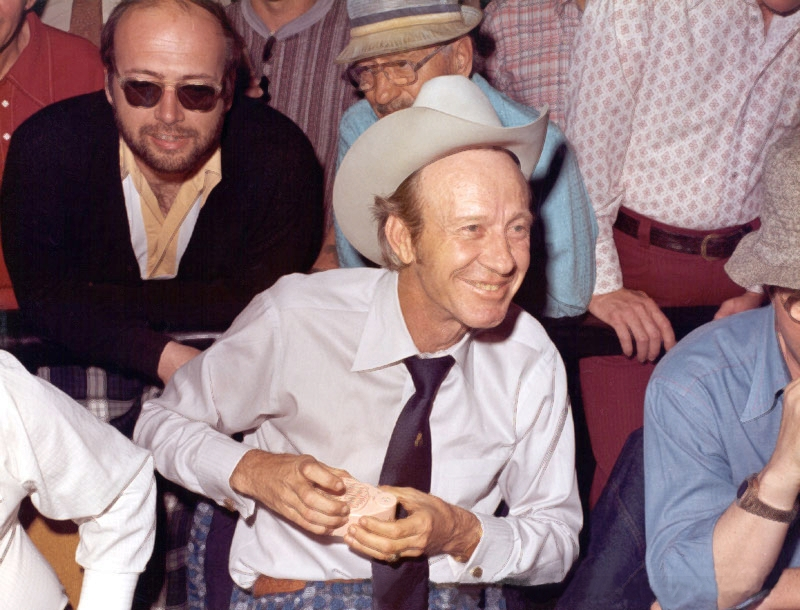
Amarillo Slim, winner of 1972 WSOP main event

The 1972 World Series of Poker (WSOP) was a series of poker tournaments held during May 1972 at the Binion's Horseshoe in Las Vegas, Nevada. It was the third annual installment of the World Series of Poker, and also the second one to feature the freezeout structure. In comparison with the previous year's series, the number of events was cut back and the buy-ins were raised, resulting in one preliminary event and the Main Event both having the same buy-in of $10,000. The preliminary event featured five-card stud poker and was won by Bill Boyd, the same man who won the 1971 five-card stud preliminary event. The previous years' double champion Johnny Moss was defeated early in the main event and Thomas "Amarillo Slim" Preston went on to win the tournament after a series of deals.

== Events ==
The preliminary event had a very small turnout, featuring only last year's five-card stud champion Bill Boyd, and an unknown player. The event was played out on May 7, and Boyd relieved the other player of his money, cashing for $20,000. Boyd became the second player in WSOP history to win multiple career bracelets, joining Johnny Moss. Boyd went on to win two more five-card stud events in 1973 and 1974 until five-card stud was dropped from the WSOP event schedule.

#	Date	Event	Entries	Winner	Prize	Runner-up	Results
1	May 7, 1972	$10,000 No Limit Five-Card Stud	2	Bill Boyd (1/2)	$20,000	Unknown	Results
2	May 11, 1972	$10,000 No Limit Hold'em Main Event	8	Amarillo Slim (1/1)	$80,000	Unknown	Results

== Main Event ==
12 people were slated to appear at the Main Event, but due to reportedly attractive side cash games only eight of them appeared at the tables on May 11, the date the event was scheduled to run. Half of each player's $10,000 buy-in was covered by Benny Binion, who was looking to gain publicity from the event and thus draw bigger crowds into Binion's Horseshoe. The winner of previous two WSOP main events, Johnny Moss, took an early lead in the tournament, but soon ended up eliminated. Moss hit a set of deuces with 2-2 on a 9-7-2 flop and after a 10 came on the turn, he got all-in versus Doyle Brunson's pocket aces. However, Brunson hit a third ace on the river to win the hand. Moss had almost no chips left and got eliminated shortly afterwards.

With four players left on the secondday of the tournament, Amarillo Slim, the would-be champion, was very short-stacked with less than 2,000 chips. Beating Brunson's pocket 10s with trip 5s on a 5-5-3 flop, Slim made his way back into the game and soon saw Jack Straus eliminated. With only three players (Walter "Puggy" Pearson, Brunson and Slim) remaining, casino president Jack Binion led news reporters and a television crew to the poker table. At that point, Brunson and Pearson announced they did not want to win the event. Brunson was not only afraid of not being let in on future lucrative cash games if he were to be pronounced the world champion of poker, but also of a tax audit. The players struck a deal whereupon Pearson and Brunson would let Slim win the tournament, but in return they would take the cash value of their current chip stacks from Slim's prize.

Jack Binion was very cross with the outcome, as players openly changed their play to let Slim win. He held a meeting with the players in the Sombrero room of the Binion's Horseshoe, demanding that players resume fair play. Brunson laid out his reasons and Binion allowed him to withdraw from the tournament and cash his chips, while the reason for Brunson's departure was reported to be a stomachache. The sum that Brunson received in the end is disputed; some sources lay out figures as low as $20,000, while according to Des Wilson, Brunson might have left the tournament with as much as half the prizepool.

After Brunson left, Pearson and Slim resumed play. According to Slim, Pearson was not content with the deal and was still trying to win the tournament, but in the end Jack Binion reportedly persuaded him to soft-play Slim and thus throw the match for publicity reasons. In the final hand, Pearson raised to 700 chips with 6-6 (of unknown suits) and Slim called with K♥ J♦. A flop of K-8-8 was seen. Slim went all-in and Pearson promptly called, both players getting all their chips in the pot. Turn and river (poker) were a deuce and an 8, respectively, and Slim won with a bigger full house. However, in the end, according to The Hendon Mob, Slim walked away from the table with winnings of mere $15,000, only three times his investment.

"[Pearson] was trying [to win the tournament] right up to the last 30 minutes. That's when it happened. They knew they couldn't get any publicity out of it if Doyle [Brunson] won it. That's not putting Doyle down – Doyle just wasn't a talker in those days. And Puggy [Pearson] wouldn't have been a good choice because about half the people he had screwed over the years were bound to say a few things. So I was the pick for winning it."

— Thomas "Amarillo Slim" Preston

Place	Name	Prize (Note: The official prize amount.)	Notes
1st	Amarillo Slim	$80,000	(Note: Amarillo Slim did not win the entire $60,000, as Pearson and Brunson received parts of the prizepool. According to some sources, Slim was left with as little as $15,000 after the deal was made.)
2nd	Puggy Pearson	None	
3rd	Doyle Brunson	None	(Note: Brunson legitimately cashed out for an undetermined amount of money, reportedly due to an upset stomach.)
4th	Crandell Addington	None	(Note: Addington is listed as the fourth place finisher in The Hendon Mob Poker Database, although he is not mentioned by any other sources. Author Des Wilson lists Straus as fourth and Moss as fifth. Addington is confirmed to have played in the event by other sources, though.)
5th	Jack Straus	None	
6th	Johnny Moss	None	
7th	Roger van Ausdall	None	
8th	Jimmy Casella	None	(Note: The Hendon Mob database mentions only the first seven players as attending the event. Although it acknowledges the presence of an eighth entrant, he/she is not named.)

== Aftermath ==
After winning the tournament, Amarillo Slim was invited to Johnny Carson's The Tonight Show on June 12 the same year. Slim later made 10 more appearances on The Tonight Show, an appearance on CBS's Hour, and a cameo in the 1974 film California Split. Slim's large media exposure contributed to the recognizance of the World Series of Poker and the popularization of poker in mainstream U.S. media and popular culture. The next year's WSOP was covered by CBS and over 7,000 newspaper articles were written about it. Time magazine featured an article on Amarillo Slim with an excerpt about WSOP and rules of poker.

== External links and further reading ==
- Alvarez, Al (1983). The Biggest Game In Town. Houghton Mifflin. ISBN 0-312-42842-1.
- Tournament results at the World Series of Poker
- Tournament results at the Hendon Mob Poker Database
