= Jack McClelland (tournament director) =

American poker tournament director and poker player (1951–2025)

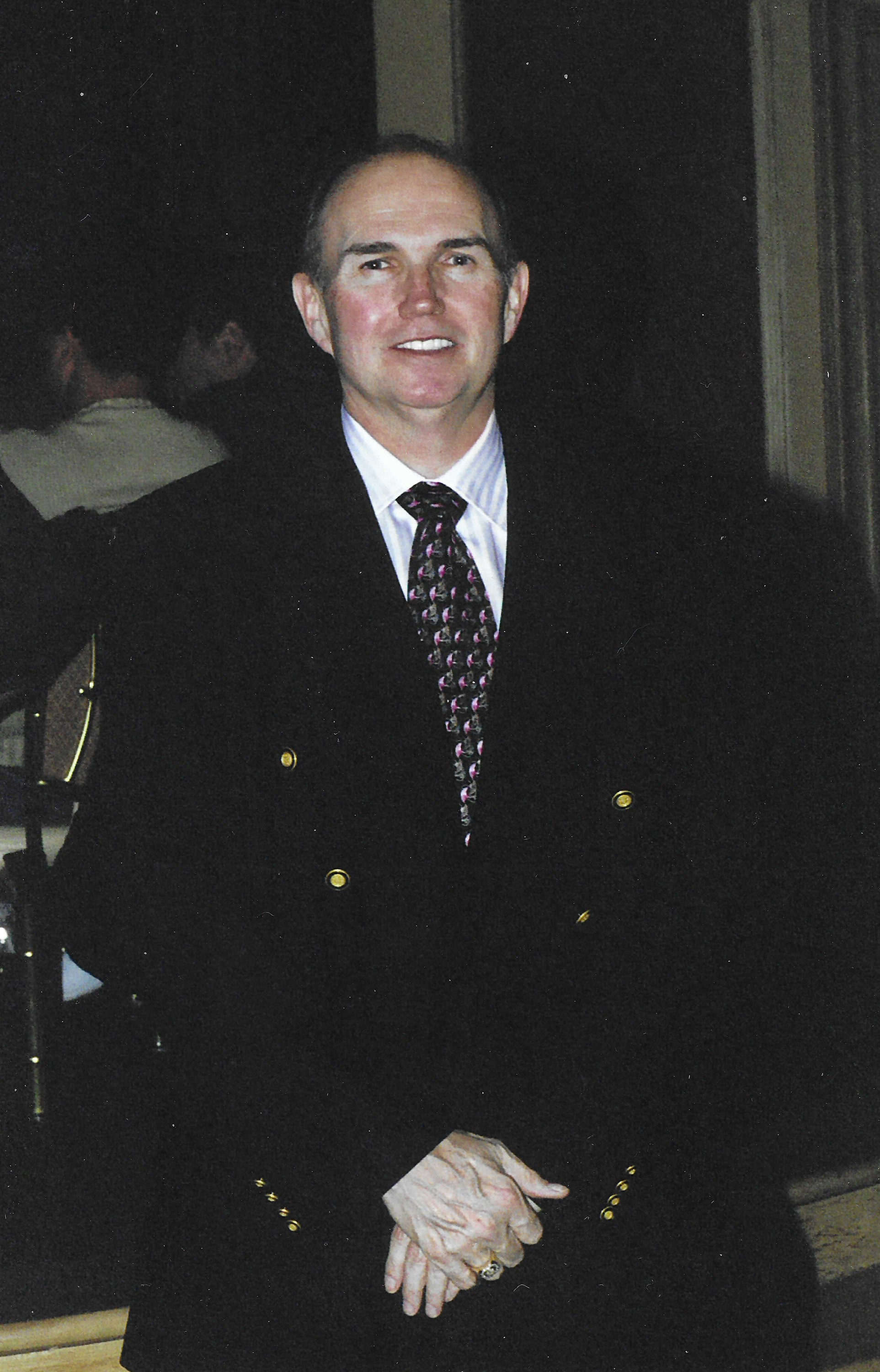
- McClelland in the early 2000s
- Born: April 19, 1951
- Died: August 18, 2025 (aged 74)

World Series of Poker
- Bracelet: None
- Final tables: 4
- Money finishes: 17

World Poker Tour
- Money finish: 1

Jack McClelland (April 19, 1951 – August 18, 2025) was an American poker tournament director and player who had a career in poker operations for more than 40 years. He was the WSOP tournament director in the 1980s, and was the tournament director of the Bellagio poker room from 2002 to 2013. In 2014, he was inducted into the Poker Hall of Fame.

McClelland retired in 2013 after the World Poker Tour Five Diamond event.

As of March 2020, his live tournament winnings exceeded $375,000.

McClelland died on August 18, 2025, at the age of 74.
