= Five-card stud =

Early poker game

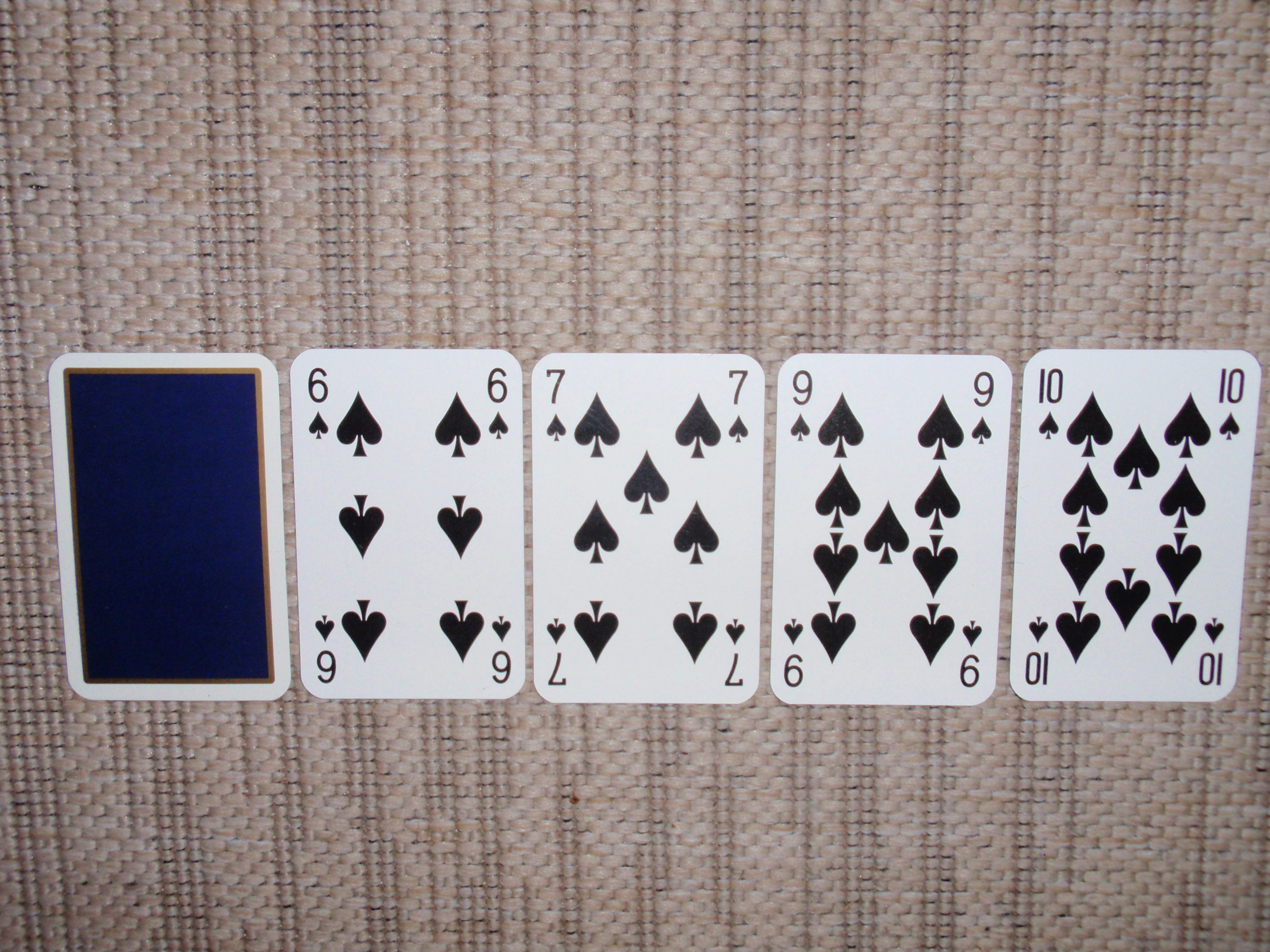
A five-card stud hand. If the face-down card is 8♠ (or a wild card) the player has a straight flush; a different ♠ will give a flush; an 8 of another suit will give a straight; a 6, 7, 9 or 10 of another suit will give a pair; any other card will give the player nothing except "high card."

Five-card stud is the earliest form of the card game stud poker, originating during the American Civil War, but is less commonly played today than many other more popular poker games. It is still a popular game in parts of the world, especially in Finland where a specific variant of five-card stud called Sökö (also known as Canadian stud or Scandinavian stud) is played. The word sökö is also used for checking in Finland ("I check" = minä sökötän).

The description below assumes that one is familiar with the general game play of poker, and with hand values (both high and low variations). The description also makes no assumptions about what betting structure is used. Five-card stud is sometimes played no limit and pot limit, though fixed limit and spread limit games are common (with higher limits in the later betting rounds). It is typical to use a small ante and a bring-in.

== Description of play ==
Play begins with each player being dealt one card face down, followed by one card face up (beginning, as usual, with the player to the dealer's left). If played with a bring-in, the player with the lowest-ranking upcard must pay the bring-in, and betting proceeds after that. If two players have equally ranked low cards, suit rankings may be used to break the tie. If there is no bring-in, then the first betting round begins with the player showing the highest-ranking upcard, who may check. In this case, suit should not be used to break ties; if two players have the same high upcard, the one first in clockwise rotation from the dealer acts first.

After the first betting round is complete, another face-up card is dealt to each player (after a burn card, starting with the player to the dealer's left, as with all subsequent rounds). Betting now begins with the player whose upcards make the best poker hand (since fewer than five cards are face up, this means no straights, flushes, or full houses). On this and subsequent betting rounds, the player to act first may check or bet up to the game's limit. The second betting round is followed by a third upcard to each player and a third betting round, again starting with the player with the best poker hand showing (thus, the first player to act on each round may change). A fourth face-up card and fourth betting round is followed by a showdown, if necessary (it usually won't be – most deals of five-card stud end early when a player bets and gets no calls).

=== Example ===
Assume that a game is being played by four players: Alice, who is dealing; Bob, who is sitting to her left; Carol to his left; David to Carol's left. Alice deals one card face down to each player, followed by one card face up to each player, beginning with Bob and ending with herself. Bob is dealt the 4♠, Carol the Q♦, David the 4♦, and Alice the 9♣. Because they had earlier agreed to play with a $1 bring-in, David is required to start the betting with a $1 bring-in (his 4♦ is lower than Bob's 4♠ by suit). He has the option to open the betting for more, but he chooses to bet only the required $1. The bring-in sets the current bet amount to $1, so Alice cannot check. She decides to call. Bob folds, indicating this by turning his upcard face down and discarding his cards. Carol raises to $3. David folds (forfeiting his bring-in), and Alice calls.

==== Third street ====
Alice now deals a second face-up card to each remaining player: Carol is dealt the J♣, and Alice the Q♥. Alice's two face-up cards make a poker hand of no pair, Q-9 high, and Carol has Q-J high, so it is Carol's turn to bet. She checks, as does Alice, ending the betting round.

==== Fourth street ====
Another face-up card is dealt: Carol gets the 3♥, and Alice gets the Q♣. Alice now has a pair of queens showing, and Carol still has no pair, so Alice bets first. She bets $5, and Carol calls.

==== Fifth street ====
The final card is dealt face up: Carol gets the A♦ and Alice gets the 4♥. Carol still only has no pair showing, thus resulting in Alice, with her pair of queens showing, set to start the betting. Alice bets $5 and is raised to $10 by Carol. Alice calls and the two must now enter into a showdown - where both players compare their best five-card poker hand. Since Carol was the last player to take aggressive action, she shows first - flipping over her hole card, the A♣ - thus giving her a pair of aces. Since she is the last to act, Alice is allowed to muck her cards and does so. Therefore, the pot of $37 goes to Carol.

== Popularity ==
Since its popularity during the American Civil War, five-card stud has seen a gradual decline in its popularity. Despite this drop in status, it is still enjoyed by many players.

=== Major tournaments ===
Five-card stud was one of the preliminary events in the World Series of Poker in 1971, 1972, 1973 and 1974. All four of these events were won by Bill Boyd (he won a total of $80,000 from these four events) – the only WSOP bracelets he won. Due to the declining popularity of five-card stud, it was left out of the 1975 World Series of Poker and has been absent from all subsequent World Series of Poker schedules. Although five-card stud has not been featured in major tournaments since the 70s, it was occasionally still offered in the 1990s in both Europe and North America.

=== Cash games ===
Five-card stud was limited to small home games and small casino games until becoming available at some online poker cardrooms.

== Variants ==
Traditional five-card stud involves one hole card with four cards face-up, making it simple for even a novice to read the possible hand strength of an opponent effectively. The transparency of a player's hand cuts out much of the element of uncertainty found in more popular games like Texas hold 'em, Omaha hold 'em and Seven-card stud. In order to enlarge that element of uncertainty variants increase the number of hole cards, add a high-low split, play with a stripped deck, introduce a twist round, enable the player to do a 'roll your own' game or even create new and interesting hand rankings.

=== High-Low ===
The game can be played with low hand values, in which case the best low hand showing starts each betting round instead of the best high hand showing. Also, the highest-ranking card must pay the bring-in if it is played with a bring-in. At the end of all betting rounds, the total pot is split into two - one for low-ranking hands, the other for high-ranking hands - and the hands are evaluated based on both low-ranking criteria (for the low pot) and high-ranking criteria (for the high pot). When playing High-Low it is common to use the Ace-to-five low hand ranking to evaluate the low hands and use the standard hand ranking when evaluating high hands. In the United Kingdom, however, the use of Ace-to-six low hand ranking is common when evaluating low hands.

=== Canadian Stud/Scandinavian Stud/Sökö ===
This variant of five-card stud is almost identical to the traditional format, the only difference being the introduction of two new hands into the hand ranking. Due to the sparse nature of flushes and straights in five-card stud, this variant counts four-card straights and four-card flushes as poker hands. A four-card straight is ranked higher than a pair, a four-card flush is ranked higher than a four-card straight, and a two-pair is ranked higher than a four-card flush.

=== Two Down, Three up/2-3 ===
Instead of dealing the players one hole card and one upcard, in this variant the players are dealt two hole cards. All subsequent cards are dealt face up, resulting in the fairly self-explanatory name.

=== Three Down, Two Up/3-2 ===
Instead of dealing the players one hole card and one upcard, in this variant players are dealt three cards face down. The next two cards are dealt face up. As a result of the high number of cards dealt initially, this variant only has 3 rounds of betting and is thus best played with no limit or pot limit betting structure. The name is again fairly self-explanatory.

=== One Down, Three Up, One Down/1-3-1 ===
This variant differs from traditional five-card stud only in the way the final card is dealt. Rather than being face up, in this variant the river is dealt face down—as a hole card. The name, yet again, derives from how a hand looks after all betting rounds are done. This is also a common variant in Finland, where the action of players looking to their hole river card secretly from the others is called "pihistäminen", (Engl. "petty theft").

=== Mexican stud/Stud Loco/Mexican poker ===
Mexican stud is a roll your own game where the player receives five face-down cards, and has to reveal four of them. The player is dealt two cards (as in traditional five-card stud), and that he/she must expose one of them. The player then receives a third card, and must immediately expose another card in his/her hand. The player exposes another one after receiving a fourth card, and again after a fifth card. Sometimes a stripped deck is used. Mexican stud is also a variant of Seven-card stud, employing the same roll your own rules.

==== Shifting sands ====
This game's only difference in relation to Mexican stud is that the player's hole card, and all cards of that rank, are considered wild cards for that player only.

=== Telesina/Teresina ===
Telesina, with origins in Sanremo, is often described as a variant of five-card stud. The initial four rounds are identical to five-card stud, the players receiving two cards (one face down) and then 3 more face-up cards interspersed with betting rounds. However, a final round is added where all the players are dealt a single community card. The other main difference is the use of a stripped deck - with all cards of rank 2 to 6 inclusive taken out of the deck. As a result, this variant is often played shorthanded - usually with 6 players per table. As with most stripped deck games, in Telesina flushes are ranked above full-houses. In addition, unlike in traditional poker, suits are used to break ties. If players have an identical straight flush or straight, the high suit wins. If both players have the same pair or two pair, the suit of the highest kicker determines the winner. The order of suits, strongest to weakest, is hearts, diamonds, clubs, spades. Another unique rule states if two players have a flush the highest-ranking card is not used to determine a winner; instead, the Telesina suit order is used to resolve the situation. The final Telesina-specific rule states if there are only two players left in the pot, the highest straight flush (A, K, Q, J, T in hearts) is beaten by the lowest straight flush (T, 9, 8, 7, A in spades). Note that these rules are as the game has been played on several online poker sites, but Telesina may generically refer to any stripped deck five-card stud variation.

=== Asian five-card stud / Americana ===
Regular five-card stud played with a stripped deck - with all cards of rank 2 to 6 inclusive removed from the deck. This variant has been played in a tournament format in California. Called Americana, the game has been available on online poker sites. As with other stripped deck games, a flush is ranked higher than a full house. This is different from the game Asian stud which is played against the house.
