= Puggy Pearson =

American poker player (1929–2006)

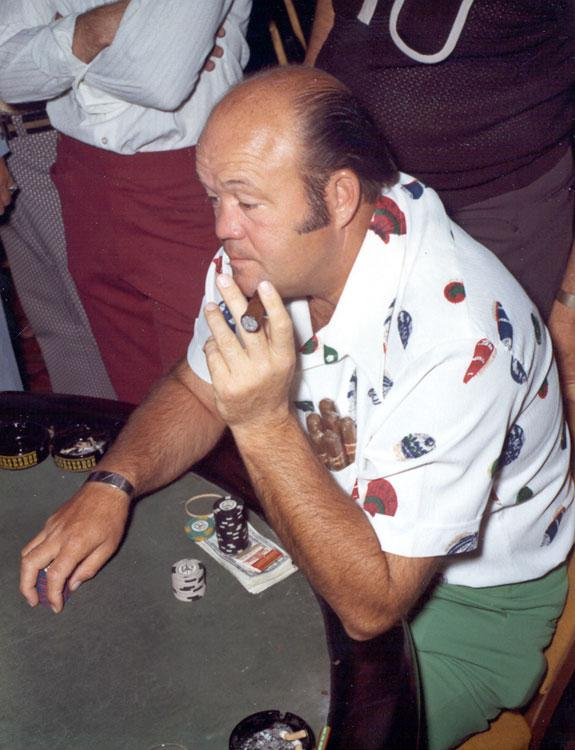
- Pearson in the 1974 World Series of Poker
- Nickname: Puggy
- Born: January 29, 1929; Adairville, Kentucky, U.S.
- Died: April 12, 2006 (aged 77); Las Vegas, Nevada, U.S.

World Series of Poker
- Bracelets: 4
- Money finishes: 9
- Highest WSOP Main Event finish: Winner, 1973

Walter Clyde "Puggy" Pearson (January 29, 1929 – April 12, 2006) was an American professional poker player. He is best known as the 1973 World Series of Poker Main Event winner.

== Early years ==
Pearson was born in Kentucky and raised in Tennessee in a family with nine siblings. He got his nickname "Puggy" from a childhood accident that left him with a disfigured nose at the age of twelve. He dropped out of school in the fifth grade, and at the age of 17, he joined the United States Navy, where he served three tours. He strengthened his skills at poker and gambling while in the Navy.

== Professional poker career ==
Prior to 1949, all poker games were cash games; a player could cash out his chips and leave at any time. Pearson originated the idea of a freezeout tournament and shared his idea with fellow gambler "Nick the Greek" Dandolos in the early 1950s. Dandolos later brought the idea to legendary casino owner Benny Binion. After further urging by Pearson, Amarillo Slim, and Doyle Brunson, all of whom felt that such a tournament would create great side (cash) game action, Binion founded the World Series of Poker (WSOP) in 1970. Pearson participated in the first WSOP that year along with Amarillo Slim, Doyle Brunson, Sailor Roberts, Crandell Addington, and Carl Cannon.

Pearson won his first WSOP bracelet in the 1971 Limit Seven-Card Stud preliminary event.

Pearson was involved in a controversial ending to the 1972 WSOP Main Event. He ended up being the runner-up to Amarillo Slim, but there was a question of fair play.

In 1973, Pearson won two preliminary events in the WSOP. In the same World Series, he won the Main Event when his A♠ 7♠ defeated Johnny Moss's K♥ J♠. With the Main Event victory, Pearson became the first player in WSOP history to win three events in a single year. This record has since been matched by five others. He won four bracelets, two of which were in seven-card stud and two of which were No limit hold'em.

Pearson was known as a man who would always seek out the biggest game in town, whether it was in the poker room or on the golf course. He owned a RV, which he called the Roving Gambler, with this painted on the side: "I'll play any man from any land any game he can name for any amount I can count, provided I like it."

Pearson was inducted into the Poker Hall of Fame in 1987.

== World Series of Poker Bracelets ==
Year	Tournament	Prize (US$)
1971	Limit Seven-Card Stud	$10,000
1973	$10,000 No Limit Hold'em World Championship	$130,000
1973	$1,000 No Limit Hold'em	$17,000
1973	$4,000 Limit Seven-Card Stud	$32,000

== Death ==
Pearson, who had a long history of heart problems, died on April 12, 2006.
