= Carl Cannon =

Carl Cannon may refer to:

- Carl Cannon (poker player)
- Carl M. Cannon (born 1953), American journalist
