= Blondie Forbes =

American poker player and road gambler

- Occupation: Gambler
- Known for: Creating Texas hold'em

T. "Blondie" Forbes was a poker player and road gambler who was the sole 1980 inductee into the Poker Hall of Fame. Forbes is credited with creating the game of Texas hold'em.
