= Murph Harrold =

American poker player

Murph Harrold was an American poker player, and was regarded as one of the best deuce-to-seven lowball poker players ever. He was inducted into the Poker Hall of Fame in 1984.
