= Starla Brodie =

American poker player (1955–2014)

- Born: April 22, 1955
- Died: April 8, 2014 (aged 58)

World Series of Poker
- Bracelets: 2
- Final tables: 6
- Money finishes: 7
- Highest WSOP Main Event finish: None

Starla Brodie (April 22, 1955 – April 8, 2014) was a two-time World Series of Poker (WSOP) champion having won the 1979 Mixed Doubles – No Limit Hold'em (with Doyle Brunson) and the 1995 $1,000 Ladies – Limit 7 Card Stud event.

Her total WSOP tournament winnings total $57,030.

Brodie died in April 2014.

== World Series of Poker bracelets ==
Year	Tournament	Prize (US$)
1979	$600 Mixed Doubles No Limit Hold'em (with Doyle Brunson)	$4,500
1995	$1,000 Ladies - Limit 7 Card Stud	$35,200
