= Henry Green (poker player) =

American poker player and road gambler

- Occupation: Gambler
- Awards: Poker Hall of Fame inductee

Henry Green was a road gambler and poker player from Alabama. He was inducted into the Poker Hall of Fame in 1986.
