= Red Hodges =

American poker player

- Occupation: Poker player
- Awards: Poker Hall of Fame

Red Hodges was an American poker player. He was inducted into the Poker Hall of Fame in 1985.
