= Joe Bernstein (poker player) =

Poker player and gambler (1899–1975)

Joseph Bernstein
- Born: January 5, 1899
- Died: November 12, 1975 (aged 76)

World Series of Poker
- Bracelet: 1
- Money finish: 1

Joe Bernstein (January 5, 1899 – November 12, 1975) was a poker player and gambler. He played poker with Titanic Thompson in his poker career.

He won one WSOP bracelet, the 1973 Limit Ace to Five Draw event.

Joe Bernstein was inducted into the Poker Hall of Fame in 1983.
