= Longworth, Texas =

- Unincorporated community
- Location within Texas Location within the United States
- Coordinates: 32°39′01″N 100°20′44″W
- Country: United States
- State: Texas
- County: Fisher
- Elevation: 1,969 ft (600 m)
- Time zone: UTC-6 (Central (CST))
  - Summer (DST): UTC-5 (CDT)
- Area code: 325
- GNIS feature ID: 1374718

Longworth is an unincorporated community in Fisher County, Texas, United States.

Doyle Brunson, a professional poker player, was born in Longworth.
