= Red Winn =

American poker player (1896–1980)

J. H. "Red" Winn (1896 – 1980) was a professional poker player in the early days of poker. He was considered an "all-around great poker player". Winn was an original inductee into the Poker Hall of Fame in 1979.
