= Amarillo Slim Dealer's Choice =

1991 video game

- Developer: John Comeau
- Publisher: Villa Crespo Software
- Platform: MS-DOS
- Release: 1991

Amarillo Slim Dealer's Choice is a poker video game developed by John Comeau and published in 1991 for MS-DOS by Villa Crespo Software. It bears the name of poker player and professional gambler Amarillo Slim.

== Gameplay ==
Amarillo Slim Dealer's Choice is a game in which players have their choice in poker games, with 7 basic versions of poker, and allows players to use house rules.

== Reception ==
Alan Emrich reviewed the game for Computer Gaming World, and stated that "Amarillo Slim Dealer's Choice is a great leap for poker enthusiasts. With the most opponents, most options and best gameplay, Amarillo Slim Dealer's Choice wins the pot, hands down!"
