= 1970 World Series of Poker =

Poker cash game session and ballot

- Location: Binion's Horseshoe, Las Vegas, Nevada
- Dates: May 8

Champion
- (United States) Johnny Moss

The 1970 World Series of Poker (WSOP) was first held on May 8, 1970. Unlike the WSOP events that followed it, which are decided using a freeze-out tournament, the 1970 champion was decided from a vote by the players. Jack Binion invited the best seven poker players in America to his Binion's Horseshoe casino in Las Vegas, Nevada to decide who was America's best poker player.

After a cash game session, Johnny Moss was voted the best in the world by "Amarillo Slim" Preston, Sailor Roberts, Doyle Brunson, Puggy Pearson, Crandell Addington, and Carl Cannon. Moss was awarded a silver cup rather than a bracelet, which was not established as the prize until 1976.

According to an apocryphal legend, two votes were taken to determine the best player in the world. In the first, the players were asked to vote for the best player, and, the story goes, each voted for himself. In the second vote, they were asked to vote for the second-best player, and Moss won the vote and was awarded the title.

The 1970 WSOP had the fewest events (just one) as well as the smallest main event field in WSOP history.
