= 1971 World Series of Poker =

Series of poker tournaments

- Location: Binion's Horseshoe, Las Vegas, Nevada
- Dates: May 6 – May 10

Champion
- (United States) Johnny Moss

The 1971 World Series of Poker (WSOP) was a series of poker tournaments held at Binion's Horseshoe during May 6–10, 1971. This was the second installment of the World Series of Poker, but unlike at the 1970 event, freezeout tournaments were played to decide the winner of the main title. The freezeout structure replaced the cash games, and it was kept in use ever since. Five freezeouts were played in total—four preliminary events and the Main Event—each featuring a different poker variant. The preliminary events required player to put up a buy-in of $1,000, while the Main Event buy-in was $5,000.

== Events ==
The 1971 WSOP featured four preliminary events. Event #4 saw Johnny Moss become the first player in WSOP history to win multiple career bracelets.

#	Date	Event	Entries	Winner	Prize	Results
1	May 6, 1971	$1,000 Limit Seven-card stud	Unknown	Puggy Pearson (1/1)	$10,000	Results
2	May 7, 1971	$1,000 Limit Razz	Unknown	Jimmy Casella (1/1)	$10,000	Results
3	May 8, 1971	$1,000 No Limit Five-card stud	Unknown	Bill Boyd (1/1)	$10,000	Results
4	May 9, 1971	$1,000 Limit Ace-to-five Draw Lowball	Unknown	Johnny Moss (1/2)	$10,000	Results
5	May 10, 1971	$5,000 No Limit Hold'em Main Event	6	Johnny Moss (2/3)	$30,000	Results

== Main Event ==
The 1971 WSOP Main Event was held on May 10, 1971. There were six entrants to the Main Event, each paying $5,000 to enter the tournament. The game played was no limit Texas hold 'em. Johnny Moss won the tournament and took the whole prize pool. Moss's victory that year was the first time a player had been awarded the Main Event Championship two years in a row, a feat that would later be also accomplished by Doyle Brunson (in 1976 and 1977), Stu Ungar (in 1980 and 1981), and Johnny Chan (in 1987 and 1988). Moss became the first player in WSOP history to win three bracelets with the win - resulting in the first "multi-bracelet" summer. Following the 1971 Main Event, the buy-in would be upped to $10,000, a figure that remains to this day. Five future Main Event winners all took part in the six-man tournament.

=== Final table ===
Place	Name	Prize
1st	Johnny Moss	$30,000
2nd	Jack Straus	None
3rd	Doyle Brunson	None
4th	Jimmy Casella	None
5th	Puggy Pearson	None
6th	Sailor Roberts	None
