= 1969 Texas Gamblers Reunion =

Poker cash game session and ballot

- Location: Holiday Hotel and Casino, Reno, Nevada

Champion
- (United States) Crandell Addington

The 1969 Texas Gamblers Reunion was a series of poker tournaments held in 1969. Unlike the WSOP events that followed it, which are decided using a freeze-out tournament, the 1969 champion was decided by the highest money winner.
