= Crandell Addington =

American businessman and poker player (1938–2024)

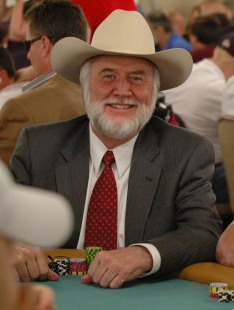
- Addington at the 2005 World Series of Poker
- Nickname: Dandy
- Born: June 2, 1938; Graham, Texas, U.S.
- Died: April 14, 2024 (aged 85); San Antonio, Texas, U.S.

World Series of Poker
- Bracelet: None
- Money finishes: 3
- Highest WSOP Main Event finish: 2nd, 1972, 1978

Crandell Addington (June 2, 1938 – April 14, 2024) was an American businessman and poker player who is best known as one of the founders of the World Series of Poker (WSOP), and is a member of the Poker Hall of Fame.

== Poker ==
Known as "Dandy" because he was always well-dressed, Addington was a regular player in the Texas poker circuit in the 1960s. In 1969, he won the Texas Gamblers Convention in Reno, Nevada; it was there that the idea for the World Series of Poker was conceived. At the time, Addington was already a self-made millionaire who played poker primarily for fun; for him, the game was more about personal challenge.

Addington participated in the first World Series of Poker in 1970 along with Amarillo Slim, Doyle Brunson, Sailor Roberts, Puggy Pearson, and Carl Cannon. Addington made the final table of the WSOP Main Event almost every year from 1972 to 1979, and still holds the record for most final table appearances (seven). He finished second on two occasions, losing to Johnny Moss in 1974 and Bobby Baldwin in 1978. However, since the WSOP Main Event was winner-take-all until 1978, most of these appearances were not in the money finishes.

Although he was no longer an active player and had not had a tournament cash from 1990, fellow Hall of Famer Doyle Brunson described him as a "No Limit Hold'em Legend".

In 2005, Addington took another shot at a WSOP win when he returned to Vegas to be inducted into the Poker Hall of Fame, but did not fare as well as he had in the 1970s.

His total live tournament winnings exceeded $160,000.

== Business ==
Addington graduated from Southwestern University with majors in economics and accounting. He left his professional poker career in the 1980s to put his business degree to work. Over the course of his 40 years as an entrepreneur, he founded successful businesses ranging from chemical manufacturing to oil and gas exploration.

Addington was the CEO, Chairman, and Director of Phoenix Biotechnology, a company that focuses on cancer treatment research.

== Death ==
Addington died on April 14, 2024, at the age of 85.
