= Business machine =

Business machine is a somewhat obsolete term for a machine that assists in the clerical activities common in business companies. Examples include:

- Tabulating machine
- Accounting machine
- Adding machine
- Typewriter
- Computer
- Photocopier

== See also ==
- International Business Machines, better known as IBM
