= Asian stud =

Casino table game

Asian stud is a casino table game introduced to the Seattle region in 2002. Each player is dealt five cards face down. The goal is to score the most points. The scoring system is the same as baccarat. Aces and the one joker are worth 1 and each card is worth their numerical value with tens and face cards worth 10. Each player begins by putting in an ante. The dealer deals 5 cards face down to each player. The players may then evaluate their hand and choose to fold, raise or check. The player then splits the cards into a 3-card-hand and 2-card-hand. The 3-card-hand must total 10, 20, or 30 points to qualify otherwise the 2-card-hand is irrelevant. If the 3-card-hand does not qualify the only way for the player to win is if the dealer also does not qualify in which case any player who did not fold wins. If the 3-card-hand qualifies for both the player and the dealer then the points in the 2-card-hand is calculated.

== Asian five-card stud poker ==
Also called Americana is a standard five-card stud played with a stripped deck - with all cards of rank 2 to 6 inclusive removed from the deck for a total of 32 cards. This variant is played against other opponents instead of the house and has been played in a tournament format in California. The game has been available on online poker sites. As with other stripped deck games, a flush is ranked higher than a full house. Some forms of Asian Five-card Stud have 36 card decks.
