= 1975 World Series of Poker =

Series of poker tournaments

- Location: Binion's Horseshoe, Las Vegas, Nevada
- Dates: May 6 – 10

Champion
- (United States) Sailor Roberts

The 1975 World Series of Poker (WSOP) was a series of poker tournaments held from May 6 to 10, 1975, at Binion's Horseshoe.

== Events ==
There were four preliminary events at the 1975 World Series of Poker. Moss became the first player in WSOP history to win five career bracelets. Future Poker Hall of Famer Billy Baxter won his first WSOP event in Event #3.

#	Date	Event	Entries	Winner	Prize	Runner-up	Results
1	May 6, 1975	$1,000 Limit Seven-Card Stud	44	Johnny Moss (1/5)	$44,000	Unknown	Results
2	May 7, 1975	$1,000 Limit Razz	17	Sam Angel (1/2)	$17,000	Unknown	Results
3	May 8, 1975	$5,000 No-Limit 2-7 Draw Lowball	7	Billy Baxter (1/1)	$35,000	Unknown	Results
4	May 9, 1975	$1,000 No Limit Texas hold 'em	32	Jay Heimowitz (1/1)	$32,000	Unknown	Results
5	May 10, 1975	$10,000 No Limit Hold'em Main Event	21	Sailor Roberts (1/2)	$210,000	Bob Hooks	Results

== Main Event ==
There were 21 entrants to the main event. Each paid $10,000 to enter the winner-take-all tournament. Roberts defeated Hooks heads-up with pocket jacks holding against a missed flush draw. Roberts and Hooks had agreed to split the first-place prize, which was unknown to Horseshoe owner Benny Binion.

=== Final table ===
Place	Name	Prize
1st	Sailor Roberts	$210,000
2nd	Bob Hooks	None
3rd	Crandell Addington	None
4th	Aubrey Day	None
5th	Unknown	None
6th	Jesse Alto	None

Sailor Roberts was one of the six players at the original 1970 WSOP and part of the famous travelling trio with Doyle Brunson and Amarillo Slim.
