= Jimmy Casella =

American poker player (1924–1976)

World Series of Poker
- Bracelets: 3
- Money finishes: 3
- Highest WSOP Main Event finish: 4th, 1971

Fiore "Jimmy" Casella (June 3, 1924 – August 10, 1976) was a prominent poker player at the World Series of Poker (WSOP) in the 1970s.

In the 1971 World Series of Poker, he won the Limit Razz event, but he found his greatest success in the 1974 World Series of Poker, where he won the Seven Card Razz and the Seven-Card Stud world championship. For winning these three events, he won $76,225. Casella became the first player in WSOP history to win the first two events of a single World Series with his victories in 1974.

After the 1974 WSOP, he did not have another cash in another major poker tournament in that era. He died of a drug overdose on August 10, 1976.

Casella was the uncle of Elizabeth Beckwith (a writer, actress, and comic) and Christian philosopher Dr. Francis J. Beckwith, whose father is the brother of Jimmy's first wife, Doris. Casella is mentioned in Dr. Beckwith's book, Return to Rome: Confessions of An Evangelical Catholic (Brazos Press, 2008)

== World Series of Poker bracelets ==
Year	Tournament	Prize (US$)
1971	Limit Razz	$10,000
1974	$1,000 Razz	$25,000
1974	$10,000 Limit Seven-Card Stud	$41,225
