= Amarillo Slim =

American poker player (1928–2012)

Amarillo Slim Preston
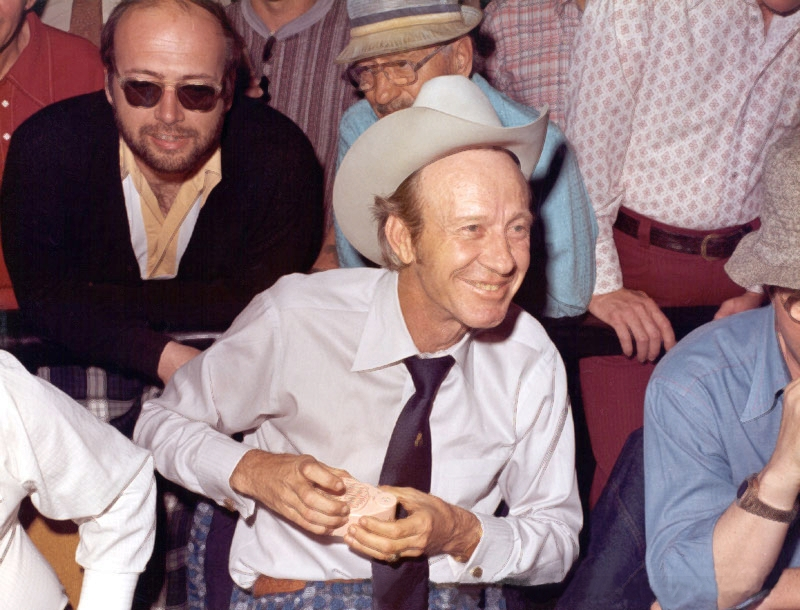
- Amarillo Slim at the 1972 WSOP
- Nickname: Amarillo Slim
- Born: Thomas Austin Preston Jr. December 31, 1928; Johnson, Arkansas, U.S.
- Died: April 29, 2012 (aged 83); Amarillo, Texas, U.S.

World Series of Poker
- Bracelets: 4
- Money finishes: 11
- Highest WSOP Main Event finish: Winner, 1972

Thomas Austin Preston Jr. (December 31, 1928 – April 29, 2012), known as Amarillo Slim, was an American professional gambler known for his poker skills and proposition bets. He won the 1972 World Series of Poker (WSOP) Main Event and was inducted into the Poker Hall of Fame in 1992.

== Poker career ==
Before becoming a well-known tournament player, Preston was a rounder, touring the United States looking for gambling action along with Doyle Brunson and Sailor Roberts, effectively introducing Texas hold 'em, the most popular poker type today, to Las Vegas in the 1960s.

Preston participated in the first World Series of Poker in 1970 along with Johnny Moss, Sailor Roberts, Doyle Brunson, Puggy Pearson, Crandell Addington, and Carl Cannon. Following his victory in the 1972 WSOP Main Event, he appeared on several talk shows, including The Tonight Show, and had a small part in the 1974 Robert Altman movie California Split. He appeared on the panel game show I've Got a Secret, where his secret involved losing $190,000 in one night of poker.

He also founded the tournament series called Amarillo Slim's Super Bowl of Poker, which ran annually between 1979 and 1991.

Preston won four WSOP bracelets, including two in Omaha. Preston's final WSOP win was in 1990. In the $2,500 Pot Limit Omaha event at the 2000 WSOP, he came in second to Phil Ivey.

In January/February 1980, Amarillo Slim hosted the Second Annual Poker Classic, which was the second-most prestigious poker tournament of its time. This series eventually came to be called the Super Bowl of Poker and continued until 1991. Gabe Kaplan became the first winner of this tournament series and Stu Ungar won the title three times.

The video game Amarillo Slim Dealer's Choice was published by Villa Crespo Software in 1991.

Preston's lifetime tournament earnings totaled more than $587,000.

=== World Series of Poker bracelets ===
Year	Tournament	Prize (US$)
1972	$10,000 No Limit Hold'em World Championship	$60,000
1974	$1,000 No Limit Hold'em	$11,100
1985	$5,000 Pot Limit Omaha	$85,000
1990	$5,000 Pot Limit Omaha	$142,000

=== Author ===
In 1973, Preston and Bill G. Cox wrote Play Poker to Win, which was published by Grosset and Dunlap. A revised edition of the book was published by HarperCollins in 2005 entitled Amarillo Slim's Play Poker to Win.

In May 2003, Preston published his autobiography Amarillo Slim in a World Full of Fat People, where he wrote of playing poker with Larry Flynt, Lyndon Johnson, and Richard Nixon among others. In addition to his poker exploits, Preston wrote about his exploits in proposition betting.

In April 2007, Preston created a website and released an E-book called All In: An E-guide To No Limit Texas Hold'em. The book was written by Preston along with Joe Brent Riley.

== Personal life ==
Thomas Austin Preston Jr. was born on December 31, 1928, in Johnson, Arkansas. When he was an infant his parents moved to Turkey, Texas. After they divorced, his mother returned to Johnson, while his father moved to Amarillo. Slim is quoted as saying: "It's a good thing he did, because Amarillo Slim sounds a heck of a lot better than Turkey Tom or Arkansas Austin." Preston was divorced, had three children, and lived in Amarillo, Texas.

Beyond being known as a great poker player, Preston was also known for playing pool and proposition betting. Notably, Slim had beaten Willie Nelson and Larry King at dominoes.

In August 2003, Preston was indicted in Randall County, Texas, on charges of indecency with a 12-year-old grandchild. The charges were reduced to misdemeanor assault in a plea bargain, and on February 10, 2004, Preston pleaded "no contest" to the reduced charges "to protect his family". Preston received a $4,000 fine, two years probation, and was "ordered to undergo counseling". In a 2009 interview, he stated that he was innocent of any wrongdoing, but chose to take the plea bargain in order to spare his family from a court trial.

Early on the morning of October 4, 2006, Preston was the victim of an attempted armed robbery. The armed robber fired three bullets into Preston's car as he sped away. Preston was not injured.

On January 28, 2007, Preston was robbed at gunpoint while in his home.

On January 22, 2009, Preston was beaten and robbed near the intersection of Interstate 40 and Soncy Road while attempting to collect a gambling debt.

Preston's autobiography was the topic of a biopic movie reported to be under development. Nicolas Cage reportedly was to play Preston's character. According to a 2009 article at Poker Listings, the "planned Hollywood movie about Slim's life" has been "dropped".

Preston died on April 29, 2012, of colon cancer at the age of 83.
