= Sailor Roberts =

American poker player (1931–1995)

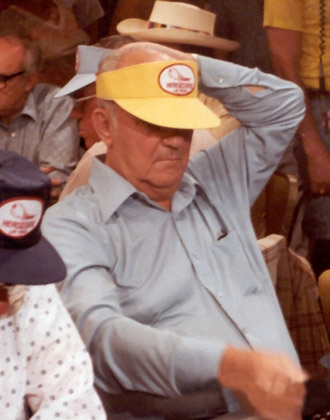
- Roberts at the 1979 World Series of Poker
- Nickname: Sailor
- Born: March 7, 1931
- Died: June 23, 1995 (aged 64)

World Series of Poker
- Bracelets: 2
- Money finishes: 3
- Highest WSOP Main Event finish: Winner, 1975

Bryan W. "Sailor" Roberts (March 7, 1931 – June 23, 1995) was an American professional poker player.

== Biography ==
Before becoming a poker professional, Roberts was a rounder and traveled the country looking for games with Doyle Brunson and Amarillo Slim. In addition to his career as a poker player, he was also a renowned contract bridge player.

Roberts participated in the first World Series of Poker in 1970 along with Amarillo Slim, Doyle Brunson, Johnny Moss, Puggy Pearson, Crandell Addington, and Carl Cannon. Roberts won his first WSOP bracelet at the 1974 World Series of Poker in the $5,000 Deuce to Seven Draw event. He won the 1975 World Series of Poker Main Event, gaining his second and final WSOP bracelet and $210,000.

Roberts earned his nickname "Sailor" for having served in the United States Navy during the Korean War.

Roberts died on June 23, 1995, from cirrhosis caused by hepatitis.

He was posthumously inducted into the Poker Hall of Fame in 2012.

== World Series of Poker bracelets ==
Year	Tournament	Prize (US$)
1974	$5,000 No Limit Deuce to Seven Draw	$35,850
1975	$10,000 No Limit Hold'em World Championship	$210,000
