= 1976 World Series of Poker =

Series of poker tournaments

- Location: Binion's Horseshoe, Las Vegas, Nevada
- Dates: May 3–10

Champion
- (United States) Doyle Brunson

The 1976 World Series of Poker (WSOP) was a series of poker tournaments held from May 3 to 10, 1976, at Binion's Horseshoe.

== Events ==
The 1976 WSOP featured seven preliminary events. Howard Andrew became the second player in WSOP history to win the first two events of a single World Series, joining Jimmy Casella from 1974. Moss's win in Event #6 made him the first player in WSOP to win six career bracelets. Future Hall of Famer and established poker professional Doyle Brunson won his first two career WSOP bracelets.

#	Date	Event	Entries	Winner	Prize	Runner-up	Results
1	May 3, 1976	$1,000 No-Limit Hold'em	56	Howard Andrew (1/1)	$28,000	Al Ethier	Results
2	May 4, 1976	$2,500 No-Limit Hold'em	25	Howard Andrew (1/2)	$24,000	Dewey Tomko	Results
3	May 5, 1976	$5,000 Deuce to Seven Draw	26	Doyle Brunson (1/1)	$90,250	Aubrey Day (0/1)	Results
4	May 6, 1976	$1,000 Ace to Five Draw	80	Perry Green (1/1)	$68,300	Bill Orman	Results
5	May 7, 1976	$1,000 Seven Card Stud Split	17	Doc Green (1/1)	$12,750	Artie Cobb	Results
6	May 8, 1976	$500 Seven Card Stud	52	Johnny Moss (1/6)	$13,000	Hal Wilber	Results
7	May 9, 1976	$5,000 Seven Card Stud	11	Walter Smiley (1/1)	$35,000	Eric Drache	Results
8	May 10, 1976	$10,000 No Limit Hold'em Main Event	22	Doyle Brunson (2/2)	$220,000	Jesse Alto	Results

== Main Event ==
There were 22 entrants to the main event. Each paid $10,000 to enter the winner-take-all tournament. The 1976 Championship was the first WSOP Main Event to award the winner a gold bracelet along with the cash prize. In the final hand of the Main Event, Jesse Alto held A♣ J♥, while Doyle Brunson held 10♠ 2♠. The flop came A♥ J♠ 10♥ giving two pairs for Alto and one pair for Brunson. Alto then led out with a pot size bet, Brunson with the chip lead countered by moving all-in, which was called. The turn came 2♣, giving Brunson two pair but still trailing, the river brought 10♦ giving Brunson a full house and the win. Doyle Brunson's win was the first of two consecutive Main Events for the future Poker Hall of Famer.

=== Final table ===
Place	Name	Prize
1st	Doyle Brunson	$220,000
2nd	Jesse Alto	None
3rd	Tommy Hufnagle	None
4th	Crandell Addington	None
5th	Bob Hooks	None
6th	Unknown	None
