= Razz (poker) =

Form of stud poker

Razz is a form of stud poker that is normally played for ace-to-five low (lowball poker). It is one of the oldest forms of poker, and has been played since the start of the 20th century. It emerged around the time people started using the 52-card deck instead of 20 for poker.

The object of Razz is to make the lowest possible five-card hand from the seven cards you are dealt. In Razz, straights and flushes do not count against the player for low, and the ace always plays low. Thus, the best possible Razz hand is 5-4-3-2-A, or 5 high, also known as "the wheel" or "the bicycle". Deuce-to-seven Razz is also sometimes played (the best possible hand is 2-3-4-5-7). Razz is featured in the mixed game rotation H.O.R.S.E. as the "R" in the game's name.

== Play ==
The best possible hand in one variant of Razz

Razz is similar to seven-card stud, except the lowest hand wins. Seven cards are dealt to each player, but only the five best cards (generally the five lowest unpaired cards) are used in forming a complete hand.

Razz is usually played with a maximum of eight players, with limit betting, meaning that there is a fixed amount that can be bet per player per round. Each player antes and is dealt two cards face down (the hole cards), and one card face up (the "door card"). The highest door card showing has to "bring it in" – put in the mandatory first bet, which is usually one third to one half of the regular bet. The player responsible for the bring-in can instead opt to "complete the bet", i.e. make a whole regular bet. If they opt to make a normal bring-in, the remaining players can either call the bet or "complete", by raising to a regular bet. From that point the betting continues in regular bet increments.

In a case where two people have a door card of the same rank, the bring in is determined by suit. Spades (♠) is the highest possible suit, followed by hearts (♥), diamonds (♦), and clubs (♣). The K♠ is the worst possible door card in Razz, and a guaranteed bring-in. Play continues clockwise from the bring in, as in normal Stud poker. After the first round of betting, each player still in the hand receives another card face up. Betting begins with the lowest hand showing. Play continues like this until the fifth card, at which point the betting increments double. The seventh card is dealt face down, and action would begin with the same player who opened betting on the 6th card. In hand-dealt games, after each hand the deal rotates to the left, as with most forms of poker; although the dealer doesn't play a strategic role as in blind games.

=== Shortage of cards ===
It is possible for the dealer to run out of cards before the end of the hand if there are eight players still in the hand when the seventh cards are to be dealt.

This is because Razz uses a standard 52 card deck, whereas seven cards for eight players would require 56 cards, meaning the hand would be four cards short.

To solve this problem, the dealer deals one final card face up in the center of the table (in lieu of a seventh card to the players): this card is a community card that all eight players may use as the seventh card in their own hands. This is the only situation where a community card is used in Razz.

== World Series of Poker ==
Razz has been an event at the World Series of Poker since 1971, when Jimmy Casella won the first ever WSOP Razz event for a grand prize of $10,000. Razz is the most popular form of lowball poker but in the overall popularity stakes sits firmly behind Texas hold 'em and Omaha hold 'em. In 2004, the WSOP Razz event was televised by ESPN; the tournament was won by professional poker player and multiple bracelet winner T. J. Cloutier. After the event Razz grew massively in popularity and most of the major online poker rooms added Razz to their spread of games. Full Tilt Poker was the first online site to offer Razz games but soon after the televised tournament, Poker.com, Absolute Poker and finally in 2006 PokerStars added Razz to their selection of games. Since 1971, Razz has been featured in every World Series of Poker apart from the 1972 series.

== London lowball ==
London lowball is a game played almost exclusively in Europe. It is almost identical to Razz in play with the following exceptions: straights and flushes count against a player for low, so the best possible hand is 6-4-3-2-A, and its canonical version is played at pot limit. Some variations of the game are played at no limit, but the name "London lowball" is typically reserved for the pot-limit version.

== Strategy ==
Normally the best starting hand in Razz is A-2-3. A general strategy in a full-ring game is to only play unpaired cards none of them higher than 8s.

Players want to avoid making pairs and should evaluate other door cards in relation to the strength of their hand. A player's hand is much stronger if there are cards of the same denomination already showing (less chance of pairing up on a draw) and weaker if there are "make" cards (cards that would allow them to make their hand) visible. For instance, Jane holds 3-4-5 and sees four "dead" door cards of 3-4-4-5 behind her. This is a strong hand, as the likelihood of pairing her hole cards is now greatly diminished. Another example: A-6-7 is a much stronger hand when other players are showing Aces, 6s and 7s than when these players are showing the make cards 2s, 3s, 4s and 5s.

Another key strategy in Razz is stealing the antes and bring-in bets. If a player is to the right of the bring-in bettor, and everyone else folds, a raise with a lower exposed card is normally the correct play. For example, if Mary has a 9 showing, and John, the bring-in bettor, has a K showing, Mary should normally raise if everyone else folds.

== See also ==
- Lowball (poker)
