= Doyle Brunson =

American poker player (1933–2023)

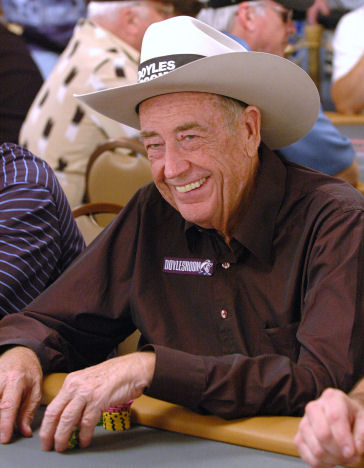
- Brunson at the 2006 World Series of Poker
- Nicknames: Texas Dolly, Big Papa
- Born: Doyle Frank Brunson; August 10, 1933; Longworth, Texas, U.S.
- Died: May 14, 2023 (aged 89); Las Vegas, Nevada, U.S.
- Favourite hand: 10x 2x (winning hand in both of his Main Event titles)
World Series of Poker
- Bracelets: 10
- Final tables: 26
- Money finishes: 37
- Highest WSOP Main Event finish: Winner, 1976, 1977
World Poker Tour
- Title: 1
- Final tables: 3
- Money finishes: 8
European Poker Tour
- Title: None
- Final table: None
- Money finish: 1

Doyle Frank Brunson (August 10, 1933 – May 14, 2023) was an American poker player who played professionally for over 60 years. He was a two-time World Series of Poker (WSOP) Main Event champion, a Poker Hall of Fame inductee, and the author of several books on poker.

Brunson was the first player to win $1 million in poker tournaments. He won ten WSOP bracelets throughout his career, tied with Johnny Chan and Erik Seidel for third all time, behind Phil Hellmuth's seventeen and Phil Ivey's eleven. He is also one of only four players to have won the Main Event at the World Series of Poker multiple times, which he did in 1976 and 1977. He is also one of only three players, along with Bill Boyd and Loren Klein, to have won WSOP tournaments in four consecutive years. In addition, he is the first of six players to win both the WSOP Main Event and a World Poker Tour title. In January 2006, Bluff magazine voted Brunson the most influential force in the world of poker.

On June 11, 2018, Brunson announced he was retiring from tournament poker that summer. That day, he entered the $10,000 2–7 Single Draw at the 2018 WSOP. He made the final table and finished in sixth place, earning $43,963.

== Early life ==
Doyle Frank Brunson was born in Longworth, Texas, on August 10, 1933, as one of three children. He went to Sweetwater High School, where he excelled at athletics. In the 1950 Texas Interscholastic Track Meet, he won the one-mile event with a time of 4:43. After receiving offers from many colleges, he attended Hardin–Simmons University in Abilene, Texas.

The Minneapolis Lakers of the NBA showed interest in Brunson, but a knee injury ended his hopes of becoming a professional basketball player. He occasionally required a crutch because of the injury and had said that breaking his leg ruined his lifetime dream of playing in the NBA. Brunson obtained a bachelor's degree in 1954 and a master's degree in administrative education the following year with plans to become a school principal.

Brunson had begun playing poker before his injury, playing five-card draw. He played more often after being injured, and his winnings paid for his expenses. After graduating, he took a job with Burroughs Corporation as a salesman for their business machines. On his first day, he was invited to play in a seven-card stud game and won more than a month's salary. He soon left the company and became a professional poker player.

== Poker career ==
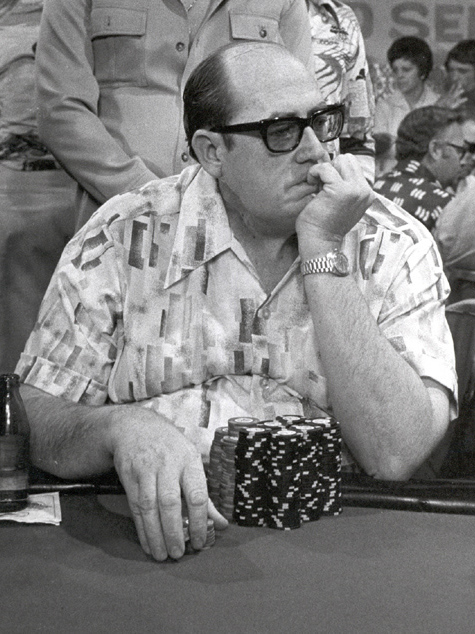
Brunson on the way to his 1976 WSOP Main Event title

Brunson started by playing in illegal games on Exchange Street in Fort Worth with friend Dwayne Hamilton. Eventually, they began traveling around Texas, Oklahoma, and Louisiana, playing in bigger games and meeting fellow professionals Amarillo Slim and Sailor Roberts. The illegal games Brunson played in during this time were usually run by criminals who were often members of organized crime, so rules were not always enforced. Brunson had recounted the violence and criminality of that era, such as the time a player at another table was shot and killed during a game.

Hamilton moved back to Fort Worth while the others teamed up and traveled together, gambling on poker, golf, and, in Doyle's words, "just about everything". They pooled their money for gambling. After six years, they made their first serious trip to Las Vegas and lost all of it, almost six figures. They decided to stop playing as partners but remained friends.

Brunson finally settled in Las Vegas. He was a regular player at the World Series of Poker since its inception in 1970, playing in the Main Event nearly every year since then, in addition to many of the other preceding bracelet-awarding events. He made some WSOP championship event final tables before his back-to-back wins, but since this was when the event was winner-take-all, they are not counted as cashes. Besides his two championship wins in 1976 and 1977, Brunson's other Main Event cashes are: 1972 (3rd), 1980 (runner-up to three-time Main Event winner Stu Ungar), 1982 (4th), 1983 (3rd), 1997 (16th), 2004 (53rd), and 2013 (409th).

Brunson authored Super/System, which is widely considered one of the most authoritative books on poker. Originally self-published in 1978, Super/System was the book credited with transforming poker by giving ordinary players insight into how professionals such as Brunson played and won, so much so that Brunson believed that it cost him a lot of money. An updated revision, Super/System 2, was published in 2004. Besides Brunson, several top poker players contributed chapters to Super/System, including Bobby Baldwin, Mike Caro, David Sklansky, Chip Reese, and Joey Hawthorne. The book is subtitled "How I made one million dollars playing poker" by Doyle Brunson. Brunson is also the author of Poker Wisdom of a Champion, originally published as According to Doyle by Lyle Stuart in 1984.

Brunson continued to play in the biggest poker games in the world, including a $4,000/$8,000 limit mixed poker game in "Bobby's Room" at the Bellagio. He also played in many of the biggest poker tournaments around the world. He won his ninth gold bracelet in a mixed games event in 2003, and in 2004, he finished 53rd (in a field of 2,576) in the No Limit Texas hold 'em Championship event. He won the Legends of Poker World Poker Tour (WPT) event in 2004 (garnering him a $1.1 million prize). He finished fourth in the WPT's first championship event.

Early in the morning on July 1, 2005, less than a week after Chan had won his 10th gold bracelet (presented to each WSOP tournament winner) – setting a new record – Brunson tied him at the 2005 WSOP by winning the $5,000 No Limit Shorthanded Texas Hold'em event. He was six bracelets behind Phil Hellmuth, who earned his 16th bracelet at the 2021 World Series of Poker. He cashed in the 2013 World Series of Poker $10,000 No Limit Hold'em Championship event, marking the fifth decade he had cashed in the event. Doyle temporarily came out of retirement from tournament play to participate in the 2021 WSOP No-Limit Hold-Em Master of Ceremonies Invitational, placing 5th behind Phil Hellmuth (4th), Norman Chad (3rd), Lon McEachern (2nd), and Vince Vaughn (1st).

As of 2023, his total live tournament winnings exceed $6,100,000. He totaled over $3,000,000 in earnings from his 37 cashes at the WSOP.

Brunson had two Texas hold'em hands named after him. The holding of ten-deuce bears his name because he won the No Limit Hold 'Em event at the World Series of Poker two years in a row with a ten and a two (1976 and 1977), in both cases completing a full house as an underdog in the final hand. The other hand known as a "Doyle Brunson", especially in Texas, is the ace and queen of any suit because, in his words, he "[tries] never to play this hand".

=== World Series of Poker bracelets ===
Year	Tournament	Prize (US$)
1976	$5,000 Deuce to Seven Draw	$80,250
1976	$10,000 No Limit Hold'em World Championship	$230,000
1977	$1,000 Seven-Card Stud Split	$62,500
1977	$10,000 No Limit Hold'em World Championship	$340,000
1978	$5,000 Seven-Card Stud	$68,000
1979	$600 Mixed Doubles Seven Card Stud (with Starla Brodie)	$4,500
1991	$2,500 No Limit Hold'em	$208,000
1998	$1,500 Seven-Card Razz	$93,000
2003	$2,000 H.O.R.S.E.	$84,080
2005	$5,000 No Limit Shorthanded Texas Hold'em (6 players per table)	$367,800

Adapted from the World Series of Poker website

== Personal life ==
Brunson met his future wife, Louise, in 1959 and married her in August 1962. Louise became pregnant, but a tumor was discovered in Doyle's neck later that year. The surgeons found that the cancer had spread when it was operated on. They felt that an operation would prolong his life enough for him to see the baby's birth, so they went ahead. After the operation, no trace of the cancer could be found.

Brunson attributed his cure to the prayers of friends of his wife and their correspondence with Kathryn Kuhlman, a self-proclaimed Christian faith healer. Louise developed a tumor shortly afterward, and when she went for surgery, her tumor was also found to have disappeared. In 1975, their daughter Doyla was diagnosed with scoliosis, yet her spine straightened completely within three months. Doyla died at 18 of a heart-valve condition.

His son, Todd, also plays poker professionally. Todd won a bracelet in the $2,500 Omaha Hi-Lo at the 2005 World Series of Poker, making Doyle and Todd the first father–son combination to win World Series bracelets. His daughter Pamela played in the 2007 World Series of Poker, outlasting Todd.

Brunson died in Las Vegas on May 14, 2023, aged 89. A Celebration of Life was held at the 2023 WSOP. Daniel Negreanu and Phil Hellmuth were among the speakers.

== SEC investigation ==
On December 14, 2005, the Securities and Exchange Commission (SEC) filed an action to enforce subpoenas issued to the attorneys of Doyle Brunson regarding his unsolicited offer in July 2005 to buy WPT Enterprises, Inc., the publicly traded owner of the World Poker Tour, at a premium over its then-market value. Shortly after that, the Commission contended, a public relations firm Brunson hired, and a website he endorsed, publicly announced the offer. The Commission asserted that the publication of this offer, widely covered in the media, triggered a steep rise in WPT's stock price on record trading volume. Brunson and his lawyers immediately stopped responding to the WPT and the media when pressed for details. Instead, after delivering the offer, Brunson withdrew from the engagement. When the WPT publicly disclosed Brunson and his law firm's unresponsiveness, its stock price sharply declined, costing investors tens of millions of dollars in lost market value.

The SEC formally investigated whether Brunson's offer and its publication violated federal securities laws, including the anti-fraud provisions of the Securities Exchange Act of 1934. Brunson invoked his Fifth Amendment right against self-incrimination and declined to testify in the investigation, directing his lawyers to withhold certain documents and, under the attorney–client privilege and work-product doctrine, not to testify on critical aspects of the offer. In December 2005, the SEC subpoenaed documents and testimony from Brunson's lawyers seeking to set aside these privileges on various legal grounds, including the crime-fraud exception, in order to compel Brunson's firm to provide the requested documents and testimony.

The case was eventually dropped by the SEC in 2007.

== Doyles Room ==
Doyles Room was an online poker room established in 2004. Originally on the Tribeca Poker Network (now part of the Playtech iPoker network), Doyles Room moved to the Microgaming (Prima) Poker Network in 2007, then to the Cake Poker Network in January 2009, and most recently to the Yatahay Network in January 2011.

On May 26, 2011, Doyles Room was seized in accordance with an investigation into the violation of online gambling laws. Following the events of April 15, Brunson cut ties with Doyles Room. In October 2011, Doyles Room was acquired by Americas Cardroom.

== Bibliography ==
- Doyle Brunson's Super System: A Course in Power Poker (1979); ISBN 1-58042-081-8
- According to Doyle (1984); ISBN 0-89746-003-0
- Poker Wisdom of a Champion (2003; formerly titled According to Doyle when published in 1984); ISBN 1-58042-119-9
- Doyle Brunson's Super System 2: A Course in Power Poker (2005); ISBN 1-58042-136-9
- Online Poker: Your Guide to Playing Online Poker Safely & Winning Money (2005); ISBN 1-58042-132-6
- My 50 Most Memorable Hands (2007); ISBN 1-58042-202-0
- The Godfather of Poker: The Doyle Brunson Story (2009); ISBN 1-58042-257-8
