= 1974 World Series of Poker =

Series of poker tournaments

- Location: Binion's Horseshoe, Las Vegas, Nevada
- Dates: May 6 – 11

Champion
- (United States) Johnny Moss

The 1974 World Series of Poker (WSOP) was a series of poker tournaments held from May 6 to 11, 1974, at Binion's Horseshoe.

== Events ==
There were five preliminary events in the 1974 World Series of Poker. Jimmy Casella became the first player in WSOP history to win the first two events of a single World Series.

The 1974 World Series of poker saw total entries cross 100 for the first time as the tournament continued to grow.

| # | Date | Event | Entries | Winner | Prize | Runner-up | Results |
|---|---|---|---|---|---|---|---|
| 1 | May 6, 1974 | $10,000 Limit Seven-Card Stud | 9 | Jimmy Casella (1/2) | $41,225 | Johnny Moss (0/3) | Results |
| 2 | May 7, 1974 | $1,000 Limit Razz | 36 | Jimmy Casella (2/3) | $25,000 | Charlie Hall | Results |
| 3 | May 8, 1974 | $5,000 No-Limit Five Card Stud | 8 | Bill Boyd (1/4) | $40,000 | Unknown | Results |
| 4 | May 9, 1974 | $5,000 No-Limit Deuce to 7 Draw | 16 | Sailor Roberts (1/1) | $35,850 | Larry Perkins | Results |
| 5 | May 10, 1974 | $1,000 No-Limit Hold'em | 21 | Amarillo Slim (1/2) | $11,100 | Pete Kay | Results |
| 6 | May 11, 1974 | $10,000 No Limit Hold'em Main Event | 16 | Johnny Moss (1/4) | $160,000 | Crandell Addington | Results |

== Main Event ==
There were 16 entrants to the $10,000 buy-in winner-take-all Main Event. Johnny Moss became the first player in WSOP history to win the Main Event three times, a feat only matched by Stu Ungar in the 1980, 1981, and 1997 Main Events. Moss's third Main Event title was a result of a four-hour heads-up duel with Crandell Addington.

=== Final table ===
| Place | Name | Prize |
|---|---|---|
| 1st | Johnny Moss | $160,000 |
| 2nd | Crandell Addington | None |
| 3rd | Sailor Roberts | None |
| 4th | Jesse Alto | None |
| 5th | Sid Wyman | None |
| 6th | Bob Hooks | None |
