= Johnny Moss =

American gambler and poker player (1907–1995)

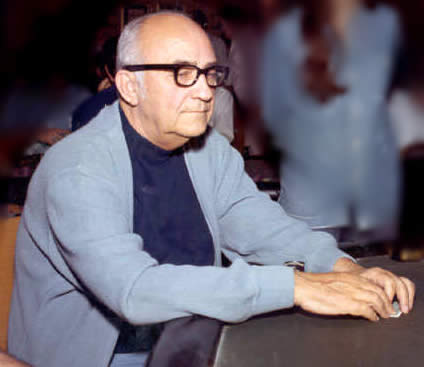
- Moss at the 1974 World Series of Poker
- Nickname: The Grand Old Man of Poker
- Born: John Moss; May 14, 1907; Marshall, Texas, U.S.
- Died: December 16, 1995 (aged 88)

World Series of Poker
- Bracelets: 9
- Money finishes: 25
- Highest WSOP Main Event finish: Winner, 1970, 1971, 1974

John Moss (May 14, 1907 – December 16, 1995) was an American gambler and professional poker player. He was the first winner of the World Series of Poker (WSOP) Main Event, at the time a cash game event in which he was awarded the title by the vote of his peers in 1970. He also twice won the current tournament format of the WSOP Main Event in 1971 and 1974. He was one of the charter inductees into the Poker Hall of Fame in 1979.

== Early years ==
Moss was born on May 14, 1907, in Marshall, Texas and grew up in Dallas, Texas, which was where he learned how to gamble as a young boy. A group of cheaters taught him how to cheat in games, but Moss put this knowledge to good use. As a teenager, he was hired by a local saloon to watch over games and make sure they were played fairly. While he was keeping games safe from cheaters, he was learning the strategy behind playing poker.

== Gambling career ==
Two years later, Moss became a rounder and traveled the country looking for gambling action. In the 1950s, Moss moved to Odessa, Texas to be a part of the oil boom and gambling action. Moss and his fellow gamblers were part of one of the biggest poker games in Texas for many years.

=== Heads-up marathon with Nick The Greek ===
In 1949, Moss played with Nick the Greek in a five-month-long "heads up" poker marathon set up by mob boss Benny Binion, winning between $2 and $4 million. At the conclusion of the game, Nick the Greek uttered what has become one of the most famous poker quotes ever: "Mr. Moss, I have to let you go." This game is often cited as the inspiration behind the WSOP. This game became the foundation for Al Alvarez's book The Biggest Game in Town and is one of the best known stories in poker. Despite being one of the best-known poker stories, claims have been made that the game never took place. According to author Steve Fischer, there were no stories or reports of this tournament until six years after Nick's death. Binion never spoke of the game even when providing a detailed history of Las Vegas and avoided answering questions about the game by saying, "Well, my memory ain't what it used to be." While Nick the Greek was often covered by the national media, there are no news reports in any local or national source. Fischer says that nearly every version of the story is virtually identical to the version first told by Moss beginning circa 1971. The story is consistently said to have taken place in 1949 at the Horseshoe Casino, a casino that did not exist for another year and a half. Fischer also points out that during the time that Binion supposedly set up the game, he was fighting off a request from Texas to have him extradited. Because of his past, Binion lost his license to run a gambling establishment in 1948 and did not regain it until April 13, 1950. He was not granted a license to open the Horseshoe Casino until December 5, 1952. Fischer believes that the notion of Binion sponsoring a poker game, in front of a window, of a casino that had not opened, while fighting extradition is "absurd."

In reaction to a 2017 pokernews.com article on the topic, Jack Binion, at the time 80 years old, attempted to clarify. To address the heart of the matter first, Binion explained that Johnny Moss and Nick Dandolos did play a poker match in 1949, although it was not at the Horseshoe at all. Nor was it the months-long spectacle open to spectators many have suggested the match to have been.

"It took place at the Flamingo," Binion explained. Also, it was "not in public." This, he noted, was a quote from Dandolos himself.

Meanwhile, a few years later there was another poker game involving Moss, this time at the Horseshoe.

"There was a big game at the Horseshoe in the early '50s," Binion explained, "but Nick didn't participate." The game featured "multiple players" including Moss, who came and went as the game continued around the clock. Unlike the game at the Flamingo in 1949, the later one "was held in public."

The confusion, Binion surmised, likely stemmed from Moss having participated in both games. However, there was never one between him and Dandolos at the Horseshoe, and the pair never did have a high-stakes heads-up battle in public. Binion also clarified that the inspiration for the WSOP was the previously held Texas Gamblers Reunion and not any Moss/Dandolos match.

=== World Series of Poker ===
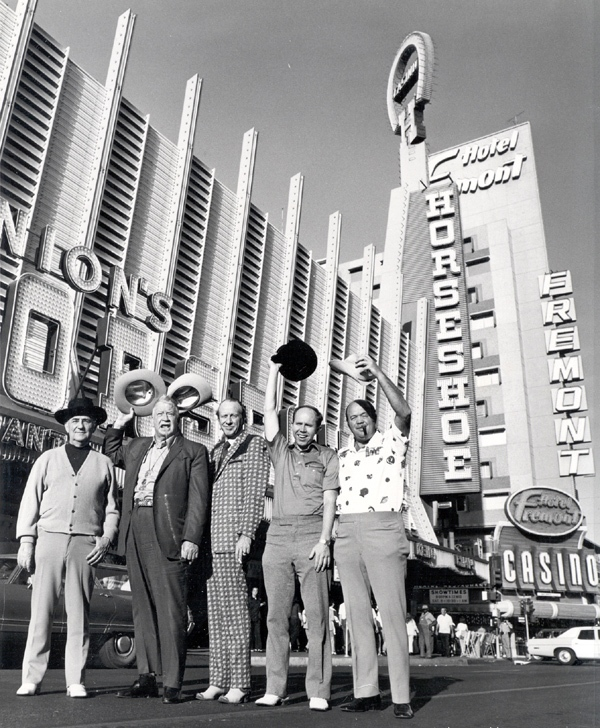
A group of players outside of Binion's Horseshoe in 1974. The players pictured are (from left to right) Johnny Moss, Chill Wills, Amarillo Slim, Jack Binion, and Puggy Pearson.

Moss won the 1970, 1971, and 1974 World Series of Poker Main Events. For the 1970 Main Event, Moss was actually elected champion by his peers and received a silver cup as his prize. A (possibly apocryphal) story about that election which has appeared in print several times has every one of the seven players voting for himself as the best player, and that it was only when the players were asked to vote for the second best player that Moss emerged. Moss was the first player to accomplish several feats at the WSOP. In the 1971 WSOP, he became the first player to be a multiple bracelet winner and to win multiple bracelets at a single WSOP. He finished runner-up to Puggy Pearson in the 1973 WSOP Main Event. Moss was the first player to win one, two, three, five, six, seven, eight, and nine career bracelets. He played at every WSOP from 1970 through 1995, and during his career, he won nine WSOP bracelets. Moss had at least a share of the lifetime WSOP bracelet lead up until the 2005 World Series of Poker, which is where Johnny Chan became the first player to win a tenth career bracelet.

==== World Series of Poker bracelets ====
| Year | Tournament | Prize (US$) |
|---|---|---|
| 1970 | World Series of Poker World Championship* | |
| 1971 | Limit Ace to 5 Draw | $10,000 |
| 1971 | $5,000 No Limit Hold'em World Championship | $30,000 |
| 1974 | $10,000 No Limit Hold'em World Championship | $160,000 |
| 1975 | $1,000 Seven Card Stud | $44,000 |
| 1976 | $500 Seven Card Stud | $13,000 |
| 1979 | $5,000 Seven Card Stud | $48,000 |
| 1981 | $1,000 Seven Card Stud Hi-Lo | $33,500 |
| 1988 | $1,500 Ace to Five Draw** | $116,400 |

^{*}In 1970, Moss was voted champion by his peers and was awarded a silver cup.

^{**}Moss set the record for the oldest bracelet winner in WSOP history, which still stands as of the end of the 2017 World Series of Poker.

== Personal life and legacy ==
Moss's wife was Virgie, who was from West Texas.

One of Moss's strategies for tournament poker was survival in the early stages. As the tournament goes on and blinds increase, his strategy was to test opponents with aggression and bigger pots.

Moss outlined his strategies in a slim 1950 book, "How to Win at Poker" The publisher's foreword demurs that there is any such person as "John Moss," stating that the name hides the identity of "a very astute midwest poker player." Further biographical details confirm that the author is indeed Moss.

Fellow professional Doyle Brunson put Moss on his Mount Rushmore of poker players, along with Puggy Pearson, Sailor Roberts, and Chip Reese.

An authorized autobiography on Moss, which is called Champion of Champions, was written by Don Jenkins.

Moss coined the phrase "It's no disgrace to go broke".
