= World Series of Poker bracelet =

Coveted prize in poker

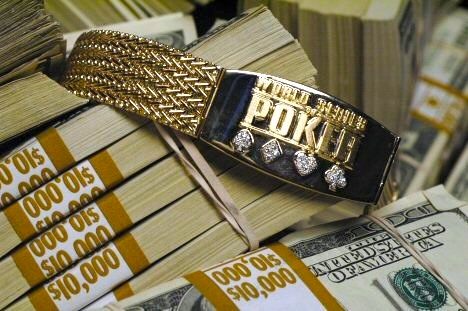
Non-Main Event gold bracelets given to the event winners during the 2005 World Series of Poker

The World Series of Poker (WSOP) bracelet is considered the most coveted non-monetary prize a poker player can win. Since 1976, a bracelet has been awarded to the winner of every event at the annual WSOP. Even if the victory occurred before 1976, WSOP championships are now counted as "bracelets". During the first years of the WSOP, only a handful of bracelets were awarded each year. In 1990, there were only 14 bracelet events. By 2000, that number increased to 24. As the popularity of poker has increased during the 2000s, the number of events has likewise increased. In 2011, 58 bracelets were awarded at the WSOP, seven at the World Series of Poker Europe (WSOPE), and one to the WSOP National Circuit Champion. This brought the total number of bracelets awarded up to 959. Five additional bracelets were awarded for the first time in April 2013 at the inaugural World Series of Poker Asia-Pacific (WSOP APAC) in Melbourne, Australia. In 2017, 74 bracelets were awarded at the WSOP and an additional 11 will be awarded at the WSOPE in Czech Republic.

After the conclusion of the 2014 WSOP APAC, there have been 1083 bracelets awarded, 500 of which were won by 170 players who have won at least two bracelets, with all of the other bracelets being won by one-time winners. This includes (up to this point) 22 Main Event winners with one bracelet: Hal Fowler, Bill Smith, Mansour Matloubi, Brad Daugherty, Russ Hamilton, Noel Furlong, Robert Varkonyi, Chris Moneymaker, Greg Raymer, Joe Hachem, Jamie Gold, Jerry Yang, Peter Eastgate, Pius Heinz, Ryan Riess, Martin Jacobson, Qui Nguyen, Scott Blumstein, John Cynn, Hossein Ensan, Damian Salas, and Koray Aldemir.

== Bracelet description ==
Main Event Championship Bracelets

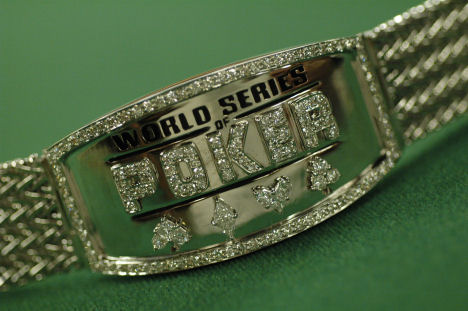
2005 World Series of Poker Championship Bracelet
Made of platinum & diamonds
Winner: Joe Hachem

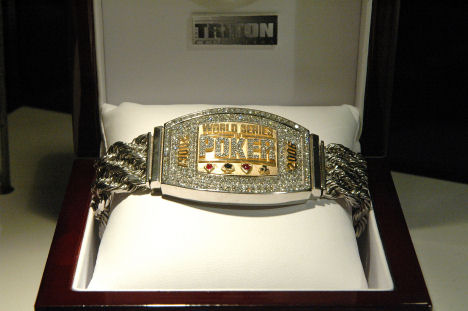
2006 World Series of Poker Championship bracelet
Made of white and yellow gold, diamonds, rubies and sapphires
Winner: Jamie Gold

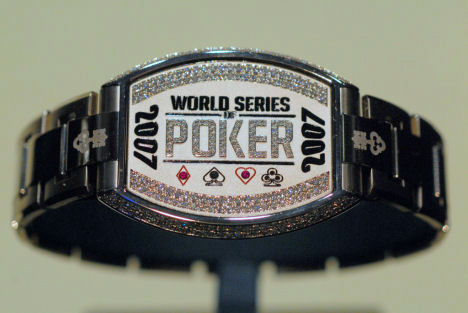
2007 World Series of Poker Championship Bracelet
Made of 136 grams of white gold, and 120 diamonds.
Winner: Jerry Yang

The 1976 bracelet looked "like gold nuggets kind of hammered flat". The bracelet in 1976 cost approximately $500. In the 1980s, Las Vegas jeweler Mordechai Yerushalmi became the exclusive manufacturer of WSOP bracelets until Harrah's Entertainment bought the rights to the WSOP in 2004. According to 2003 WSOP Champion Chris Moneymaker, the design of the bracelet remained relatively unchanged under Yerushalmi. In 2005, Gold and Diamond International based in Memphis, TN won the bid from Harrah's Entertainment to manufacture the 2005 World Series of Poker bracelets. The company also manufactures the WSOP circuit rings.

In 2006, Frederick Goldman, Inc. made the WSOP bracelets while luxury watch maker Corum introduced some commemorative watches as part of the prize package. In 2006, the Champion's bracelet had 259 stones including 7.2 carats (1.4 g) of diamonds, 120 grams of white and yellow gold. It also used rubies to represent the heart and diamond suits, a sapphire to represent the spade and three black diamonds to represent the clubs.

In 2007, Corum became the official bracelet manufacturer for the WSOP. Some of the 2007 World Series of Poker champions received both a watch and a bracelet from Corum. Corum designed four variations for the 2007 World Series of Poker Bracelets. The standard version that is presented to 53 winners features 53 diamonds. The Ladies World Champion receives a bracelet that is adorned with four black diamonds, two rubies and 87 blue sapphires. The $50,000 HORSE Champion Bracelet has 91 black diamonds and two rubies. The World Series of Poker Main Event Bracelet has 120 diamonds on 136 grams of 18-karat (75 percent) white gold. The value of the 2007 bracelets have not been released, but the typical price of a Corum watch ranges from $1,500–$30,000+.

In 2008, the Main Event Bracelet had 291 diamonds, totalling 2.81 carats set in 168 grams of 18-karat white gold. The other 54 event bracelets consisted of 55 diamonds, totalling 0.25 carats set in 80 grams of 14-karat yellow gold.

In 2010, an Australian-based company OnTilt Designs Pty Ltd won a multi-year contract to become the official bracelet manufacturer for the WSOP. OnTilt jewelers decided that the 2010 bracelet design would return to the tradition of the 1970s and 1980s where the bracelet was a heavy piece of unadorned metal. American jewelry designer Steve Soffa was chosen to design and manufacture the entire set of bracelets. The goal was to create a bracelet that somebody would actually want to wear every day. In 2011, OnTilt has also been chosen to manufacture the WSOP Circuit rings.

In 2012, Jason Arasheben, famed jewelry designer and owner of Jason of Beverly Hills was chosen as the official bracelet manufacturer of the WSOP. Arasheben had designed the championship rings for the 2009 and 2010 Los Angeles Lakers and the 2011 Green Bay Packers, among others. The Main Event bracelet will feature each suit in the deck in either rubies or black diamonds. In terms of sheer mass, it weighs in at over 160 grams of 14 karat gold and over 35 carats of flawless diamonds.

A special platinum bracelet was awarded at the 2012 WSOP to the winner of The Big One for One Drop, Antonio Esfandiari. The event was a $1 million buy-in tournament created as a fundraiser for the One Drop Foundation, a charity established by Cirque du Soleil founder Guy Laliberté.

== Prestige ==
At first, the bracelets did not have much prestige. Ten-time bracelet winner Doyle Brunson said that his first bracelet "didn't mean anything" to him and that he did not even pick up two of them.

Some professional poker players believe that there are two types of poker players: those who have won a bracelet and those who have not. Those who have belong to an exclusive club. "It's impossible to overstate the value of a World Series of Poker gold bracelet to anyone who takes the game seriously," stated World Series of Poker Commissioner Jeffrey Pollack during the 2006 bracelet unveiling. "It is the equivalent of winning the Stanley Cup in hockey or the Lombardi Trophy in American football."

Many professional poker players desire the recognition that is associated with the bracelet. Former Celebrity Poker Showdown host and poker star Phil Gordon said, "I want that bracelet more than anything." Freddy Deeb said that he did not appreciate his first bracelet because he did not recognize what it meant. He said his 2007 bracelet, however, "means everything to me". Jennifer Tilly says that winning her 2005 Women's Championship bracelet was "better than an Oscar".

When the World Poker Tour decided to offer a prize to its event champions, they decided to present them with WPT Bracelets. In so doing, WPT Founder, President and CEO Steve Lipscomb said, "The championship bracelet has become synonymous with poker as a symbol of achievement and respect, and we are honored to continue the tradition that Benny Binion [the founder of the WSOP] began over 30 years ago."

== History ==
Bracelets have not always been awarded for winning events. In 1970, the first WSOP Champion received nothing but a silver cup and whatever cash they won during the event. From 1971 to 1974, according to Becky Behnen (the daughter of WSOP founder Benny Binion), the winner received an undescribed "corny trophy". In 1975, the winners received a sterling plate. In 1976, the WSOP started the tradition of issuing bracelets to the event winners.

In 1980 and 1981, one did not have to win a WSOP event to win a gold bracelet. In 1980 and 1981, H.D. "Oklahoma Johny" Hale and Chip Reese received a gold bracelet for being the "Best All Around Player" at the WSOP, respectively. These bracelets, however, are not considered in the count of WSOP championship bracelets.

In 2007, Thomas Bihl became the first person to ever win a WSOP bracelet outside Las Vegas, Nevada. Bihl won the £2,500 World Championship H.O.R.S.E. at the World Series of Poker Europe in London, England. Days later, Annette Obrestad became the youngest player to ever win a WSOP bracelet at 18 years, 364 days, also becoming the first woman to win a World Series Main Event (WSOPE). Caesars Entertainment (known until 2010 as Harrah's Entertainment), the owner of the WSOP, considers the WSOP Europe bracelet to be the same in prestige as those awarded every year in Las Vegas.

In 2008, Jesper Hougaard became the first person to have won both a WSOP and WSOPE bracelet.

In 2011, a World Series of Poker bracelet was awarded for the first time to the WSOP Circuit National Championship winner in the 100-qualifier event from May 27–29. The following year, the Circuit National Championship moved to New Orleans, where it was held in 2013.

Starting in 2013, bracelets are also awarded in Australia at the World Series of Poker Asia-Pacific, held at Crown Melbourne.

== Bracelet legacy ==
Of the three top WSOP bracelet winners, only Johnny Chan still has them all. He keeps them locked in a vault because they are worth, according to him, "millions". Doyle Brunson did not pick up two of his. Seventeen-time bracelet winner Phil Hellmuth gave away ten of his. "To me," Hellmuth said, "the bracelets have always been a really huge deal, to me more than the other guys, because I knew that they represented history."

Three-time WSOP Bracelet winner Hamid Dastmalchi and six-time winner Ted Forrest had been playing for four days non-stop at the Mirage when Hamid started to complain about the 1992 Main Event Championship Bracelet he received. Bitter about a dispute with the Binion's Horseshoe, the owners of the WSOP at the time, Hamid told the table that the Binion's "say it's worth $5,000, but I'd take $1,500 for it." To which Forrest responded "Sold" and immediately tossed Hamid $1,500 in chips. Dastmalchi mailed Forrest his bracelet. Ted Forrest also reported that three of his five bracelets have been stolen over the years, and that he gave his daughter one.

In November 2010, Peter Eastgate put his main event bracelet up for auction on eBay with a starting bid of $16,000. It eventually sold for $147,500, and this money was donated to UNICEF.

== WSOP Circuit rings ==
In 2005, the inaugural World Series of Poker Circuit was founded, hosting events at many of their casinos around the country. In order to differentiate these events and to ensure the prestige of the WSOP Bracelet, the circuit events present a ring to the winners.

=== Circuit National Championship ===
From 2011, the WSOP awarded a bracelet to the winner of the WSOP Circuit National Championship. The Circuit Event National Championship was an invitation only event that used the standings of players from the various circuit events in determining who was invited.

== Multiple bracelet winners ==
The top bracelet winners are as follows:

Bracelets	Player	Main Event wins
17	(United States) Phil Hellmuth	2 (Note: Hellmuth's second Main Event victory came at the 2012 World Series of Poker Europe.)
11	(United States) Phil Ivey	0
10	(United States) Doyle Brunson	2
10	(United States) Johnny Chan	2
10	(United States) Erik Seidel	0
9	(United States) Shaun Deeb	0
9	(United Kingdom) Benny Glaser	0
9	(United States) Michael Mizrachi	1
9	(United States) Johnny Moss	3
8	(Canada) Daniel Negreanu	1 (Note: Negreanu's Main Event victory came at the 2013 World Series of Poker Asia Pacific.)
8	(United States) Nick Schulman	0
