= Super Bowl of Poker =

US poker tournament

The Super Bowl of Poker (also known as Amarillo Slim's Super Bowl of Poker or SBOP) was the second most prestigious poker tournament in the world during the 1980s. While the World Series of Poker (WSOP) was already drawing larger crowds as many amateurs sought it out, the SBOP "was an affair limited almost exclusively to pros and hard-core amateurs."

Six of the thirteen SBOP Main Events and many of the preliminary events were won by players eventually elected to the Poker Hall of Fame. Numerous events had several future members of the Hall sitting at the final table. For example, the competition at the final table of the 1990 SBOP Main Event included Poker Hall of Famers T. J. Cloutier, Chip Reese, Stu Ungar, Jack Keller, and 1992 WSOP Main Event winner Hamid Dastmalchi. But it was the 1986 Deuce-to-Seven Lowball event that may have had the toughest final three competitors ever. As of 2009, the final three competitors, all members of the Poker Hall of Fame, own a combined twenty-seven WSOP bracelets. Doyle Brunson, a ten-time WSOP bracelet winner, won this event. In order to win, he had to defeat seven time bracelet winner Billy Baxter and ten time bracelet winner Johnny Chan.

In addition to winning three WSOP Main Events, Stu Ungar was the only person to win the SBOP Main Event three times. Stu's first major poker tournament was at the 1980 SBOP. Four years later, having already won two WSOP Main Events, Stu's Main Event victory in 1984 helped establish the SBOP as a premier event while his back-to-back victories in 1988 and 1989, gave the SBOP a publicity boost as one of the premier poker tournaments. Prior to Stu's victory, the top professionals had encountered some difficulty at the SBOP. 1982 was noted for the poor performances of many of the game's top names. By the second break of the second day of the Main Event, all of the tournament favorites had been knocked out.

== History ==
Prior to 1979, the only high dollar tournament a person could enter was the WSOP. 1972 WSOP Main Event Champion and outspoken ambassador for poker, Amarillo Slim, saw this as an opportunity. "The World Series of Poker was so successful that everybody wanted more than one tournament," he said. Slim called upon his connections and friendships with poker's elite to start a new tournament in February 1979. Slim modeled his SBOP after the WSOP with several events and a $10,000 Texas Hold'em Main Event.

World Poker Tour commentator Mike Sexton recalls that "All the big players at the time were there. Amongst the big players [the SBOP] was very popular. They all went." While only 30 people participated in the inaugural event, six of them were future Poker Hall of Famers (Johnny Moss, Bobby Baldwin, Chip Reese, Amarillo Slim, Sailor Roberts and Doyle Brunson). It was held at the Hilton Hotel in Las Vegas, but because the Hilton closed its door to poker later that year, the tournament was forced to move to the Sahara in Reno the following year.

After two years at the Sahara in Reno, the casino was acquired by the Hilton Corporation and the SBOP was forced to change its location again. Starting in 1982, the SBOP was held at the Sahara in Lake Tahoe. After a few years at the Sahara in Lake Tahoe, Slim moved the event to Caesar's in Lake Tahoe where it would be played for just one year. The location again changed to Caesar's in Las Vegas, where it would be held for several more years. When Caesar's closed its poker room in 1990, Slim took the best deal he could find. This took the tournament to a small casino the Flamingo Hilton in Laughlin, Nevada. Slim said that in order to get to the tournament, "You had to fly to Vegas and rent a car and drive 125 miles, and that didn't go over real big." Only 12 people showed up for the 1991 SBOP Main Event. The lack of stability in the tournament's location has been cited as one of the reasons why the tournament ultimately failed.

== Prize ==
While the WSOP uses a flat model wherein there were a fairly large number of contestants making it "in the money", the SBOP used a top heavy formula where the top finishers walked away with a disproportionate share of the cash. For many of the events, the tournament only paid the top three finishers. As the SBOP grew, the number of winners increased, but the prize structure always remained top heavy. From 1985 to 1989, there were enough participants that the Main Event always paid at least the top seven players. Despite the top heavy pay-out structure, the WSOP Main Event always paid at least twice the amount as the SBOP Main Event during the same year.

One of the trademarks of the SBOP was the personalized gift from Amarillo Slim that the winner received. The first year, the gift was a $3,000 pair of customized cowboy boots, but as the tournament grew so too did the value of the gift. In 1980 a trophy was presented to the winners, with SBOP main event winner Gabe Kaplan describing it as "a loving cup that was so enormous it made the gaudy gold bracelets given to the winners at the World Series of Poker look understated."

== Key ==
*	Elected to the Poker Hall of Fame.
†	Denotes player known to be deceased.
Year	The year of the SBOP tournament.
Winner	The person who won the Main Event, number in () are the number of WSOP bracelets the person acquired.
Prize (US$)	Prize money for the SBOP Main Event.
Entrants	This column indicates the number of players in that year's Main Event. The number in the () are the number of paid prizes.
Location	This column represents where the tournament was held.
Results	This column provides a link to a breakdown of all events for that year.
Ref.	References

== Results ==
Image	Year	Winner	Prize	Entrants^{[a]}	Location	Results	Reference
	1979	George Huber	$150,000	30 (7)	Hilton Hotel, Las Vegas, NV	Results	
	1980	Gabe Kaplan	$190,000	ca 25 (2)	Sahara, Reno NV	Results	
	1981	Junior Whited	$130,000	26 (3)	Sahara, Reno NV	Results	
	1982	Ed Stevens	$195,000	ca 51 (4)	Sahara, Lake Tahoe	Results	
	1983	Hans "Tuna" Lund† (4)	$275,000	ca 50 (7)	Sahara, Lake Tahoe	Results	
	1984	Stu Ungar†* (5)	$275,000	ca. 50 (7)	^{[b]}	Results	
	1985	Mickey Appleman (4)	$205,000	41 (7)	^{[b]}	Results	
	1986	Billy T. Walters	$175,000	ca 52 (9)	^{[b]}	Results	
	1987	Jack Keller†* (3)	$220,000	ca 44 (7)	Caesars Las Vegas	Results	
	1988	Stu Ungar†* (5)	$210,000	42 (7)	Caesars Las Vegas	Results	
	1989	Stu Ungar†* (5)	$205,000	41 (2)	Caesars Las Vegas	Results	
	1990	T. J. Cloutier* (6)	$240,000	48 (7)	Caesars Las Vegas	Results	
	1991	Jack Keller†* (3)	$52,250	12 (3)	Flamingo Laughlin	Results	

== Notes ==
^{a} The number of entrants to the SBOP varies from source to source. Events marked with a "ca." indicate events where the exact number is not known.

^{b} The location of the SBOP varies from source to source. The Hendon Mob records the location of all of the events as Caesar's Las Vegas. One of the legacies of the SBOP, however, was that it could not find a permanent home and kept moving. According to Amarillo Slim, the event was held at the Sahara in Lake Tahoe for several years before moving to Caesar's in Lake Tahoe. It only stayed at Caesar's Lake Tahoe for one year before moving to Caesar's Las Vegas.
