= 1987 Super Bowl of Poker =

1987 poker tournament

The Super Bowl of Poker (also known as Amarillo Slim's Super Bowl of Poker or SBOP) was the second most prestigious poker tournament in the world during the 1980s. While the World Series of Poker was already drawing larger crowds as more and more amateurs sought it out, the SBOP "was an affair limited almost exclusively to pros and hard-core amateurs."

Prior to 1979, the only high dollar tournament a person could enter was the WSOP. 1972 WSOP Main Event Champion and outspoken ambassador for poker Amarillo Slim saw this as an opportunity. "The World Series of Poker was so successful that everybody wanted more than one tournament," he said. Slim called upon his connections and friendships with poker's elite to start a new tournament in the February 1979. Before the SBOP had developed a reputation of its own, many of the most respected names in poker attended the tournament "more to support Slim and take advantage of the very fat cash games the event would obviously inspire." Slim modelled his SBOP after the WSOP with several events and a $10,000 Texas Hold'em Main Event.

One of the principal differences between the WSOP and the SBOP was the prize structure. The WSOP's prize structure was flat ensuring more people received smaller pieces of the prize pool. The SBOP typically used a 60-30-10 payout structure. In other words, only the first three places received money and generally in the ratio of 60% to first place, 30% to second place, and 10% to third. This payment schedule predominated the SBOP for the first 5 years of the event, but as the event grew the number of payouts increased while keeping the payout schedule top heavy.

== 1987 Tournament ==
Three Poker Hall of Famers played at the final table in the $200 Pot Limit Omaha event. Johnny Chan was a relative newcomer compared to the older veterans Jack Keller and Johnny Moss, but Chan succeeded in defeating both to claim the title. Chan later made it to another final table and played against future Hall of Famer, Barbara Enright at the $200 No Limit Hold'em. Howard Andrew won the event.

=== Event 1: $ 500 Limit Hold'em ===
- Number of buy-ins: 196
- Total prize pool: $98,000
- Number of payouts: 9

Final table
| Place | Name | Prize |
|---|---|---|
| 1st | Ralph Johnson | $47,000 |
| 2nd | Robert Turner | $18,800 |
| 3rd | John Franjesh | $9,400 |
| 4th | Richard Sargent | $4,700 |
| 5th | Jeff Gold | $4,700 |
| 6th | Ali Farsai | $4,700 |
| 7th | Ken Flaton | $4,700 |
| 8th | John Cernuto | $2,000 |
| 9th | Steve Kopp | $2,000 |

=== Event 2: $ 500 Limit Seven Card Stud ===
- Number of buy-ins: 164
- Total prize pool: $82,000
- Number of payouts: 10

Final table
| Place | Name | Prize |
|---|---|---|
| 1st | Glenda Bridges | $38,000 |
| 2nd | Alex Murray | $15,200 |
| 3rd | Bill Sheppard | $7,600 |
| 4th | Buddy McIntosh | $3,800 |
| 5th | Mark Jacobus | $3,800 |
| 6th | Steve Kopp | $3,800 |
| 7th | Craig DiSalvo | $3,800 |
| 8th | Lenny Moore | $2,000 |
| 9th | Jack Lindsay | $2,000 |
| 10th | Fred Sigur | $2,000 |

=== Event 3: $ 200 Pot Limit Omaha ===
- Number of buy-ins: Unknown
- Total prize pool: $135,200
- Number of payouts: 9

Final table
| Place | Name | Prize |
|---|---|---|
| 1st | Johnny Chan* | $60,795 |
| 2nd | Berry Johnston* | $27,020 |
| 3rd | Artie Cobb | $13,510 |
| 4th | Terry Davis | $6,755 |
| 5th | Garland Walters | $6,755 |
| 6th | Jerry St. Pierre | $6,755 |
| 7th | Eddie Scwettman | $6,755 |
| 8th | Johnny Moss* | $4,053 |
| 9th | Don Williams | $2,702 |

=== Event 4: $ 1,000 Seven Card Stud Hi/Lo ===
- Number of buy-ins: 78
- Total prize pool: $78,000
- Number of payouts: 7

Final table
| Place | Name | Prize |
|---|---|---|
| 1st | Robert Turner | $39,000 |
| 2nd | Ron McMillan | $15,600 |
| 3rd | George Feher | $7,800 |
| 4th | Mike Magic | $3,900 |
| 5th | Al Korsin | $3,900 |
| 6th | Scott Dick | $3,900 |
| 7th | Barney O'Malia | $3,900 |

=== Event 5: $ 200 No Limit Hold'em ===
- Number of buy-ins: 173
- Total prize pool: $214,500
- Number of payouts: 18

Final table
| Place | Name | Prize |
|---|---|---|
| 1st | Howard Andrew | $86,400 |
| 2nd | Johnny Chan* | $38,400 |
| 3rd | David Baxter | $19,200 |
| 4th | Jim Doman | $9,600 |
| 5th | Garland Walters | $9,600 |
| 6th | Barbara Enright | $9,600 |
| 7th | Bob Lackhart | $9,600 |
| 8th | Gene Fisher | $5,760 |
| 9th | Ed Stevens | $3,840 |

=== Event 6: $ 1,000 Ace to Five Draw ===
- Number of buy-ins: 80
- Total prize pool: $80,000
- Number of payouts: 5

Final table
| Place | Name | Prize |
|---|---|---|
| 1st | Margo Marvin | $40,000 |
| 2nd | Robert Turner | $16,000 |
| 3rd | David Question | $1,200 |
| 4th | Bruce Holt | $8,000 |
| 5th | Charles Hantz | $4,000 |

=== Event 7: $ 500 Limit Hold'em ===
- Number of buy-ins: 189
- Total prize pool: $94,500
- Number of payouts: 9

Final table
| Place | Name | Prize |
|---|---|---|
| 1st | Ray Johnson | $42,525 |
| 2nd | Kelly Samson | $18,900 |
| 3rd | J.C. Pearson | $9,450 |
| 4th | Bill Smith | $4,725 |
| 5th | Elvis Russell | $4,725 |
| 6th | Tom McGuire | $4,725 |
| 7th | Billy Smith | $4,725 |
| 8th | Elmer Thomas | $2,835 |
| 9th | Barbara Enright* | $1,890 |

=== Event 8: $ 1,000 Seven Card Stud ===
- Number of buy-ins: Unknown
- Total prize pool: $189,822
- Number of payouts: 3

Final table
| Place | Name | Prize |
|---|---|---|
| 1st | Robert Turner | $51,500 |
| 2nd | Max Stern | $20,600 |
| 3rd | Buddy McIntosh | $10,300 |
| 4th | Terry King | $5,150 |
| 5th | Jim Dickerson | $5,150 |
| 6th | Tom McEvoy | $5,150 |
| 7th | Mike Ungurean | $5,150 |

=== Event 9: $ 2,500 No Limit 2-7 Lowball ===
- Number of buy-ins: 32
- Total prize pool: $94,500
- Number of payouts: 3

Final table
| Place | Name | Prize |
|---|---|---|
| 1st | Jack Keller* | $48,000 |
| 2nd | Berry Johnston* | $24,000 |
| 3rd | Seymour Leibowitz | $8,000 |

=== Event 10: $ 200 Pot Limit Omaha ===
- Number of buy-ins: Unknown
- Total prize pool: $189,822
- Number of payouts: 9

Final table
| Place | Name | Prize |
|---|---|---|
| 1st | Dolph Arnold | $83,745 |
| 2nd | Joe Petro | $37,220 |
| 3rd | Gene Fisher | $18,610 |
| 4th | Ken Flaton | $9,305 |
| 5th | Seymour Leibowitz | $9,305 |
| 6th | Artie Cobb | $9,305 |
| 7th | John Franjeah | $9,305 |
| 8th | Unknown | $9,305 |
| 9th | Jim Dickerson | $3,722 |

=== Event 11: $ 1,000 No Limit Hold'em ===
- Number of buy-ins: 140
- Total prize pool: $140,000
- Number of payouts: 10

Final table
| Place | Name | Prize |
|---|---|---|
| 1st | Gene Fisher | $63,000 |
| 2nd | George Huber | $28,000 |
| 3rd | Yosh Nakano | $14,000 |
| 4th | Ken Lambert | $7,000 |
| 5th | Ron McMillan | $7,000 |
| 6th | Curtis Skinner | $7,000 |
| 7th | Barbara Gold | $7,000 |
| 8th | Dolph Arnold | $4,200 |
| 9th | Mike Cox | $1,400 |
| 10th | Frank Henderson | $1,400 |

=== Event 12: $ 10,000 No Limit Hold'em ===
- Number of buy-ins: Unknown
- Total prize pool: $440,000
- Number of payouts: 7

Final table
| Place | Name | Prize |
|---|---|---|
| 1st | Jack Keller* | $220,000 |
| 2nd | Chip Reese* | $88,000 |
| 3rd | Tuna Lund | $44,000 |
| 4th | Perry Green | $22,000 |
| 5th | Dick Carson | $22,000 |
| 6th | Jim Ward | $22,000 |
| 7th | Max Stern | $22,000 |
