= 1990 Super Bowl of Poker =

1990 poker tournament

The Super Bowl of Poker (also known as Amarillo Slim's Super Bowl of Poker or SBOP) was the second most prestigious poker tournament in the world during the 1980s. While the World Series of Poker was already drawing larger crowds as more and more amateurs sought it out, the SBOP "was an affair limited almost exclusively to pros and hard-core amateurs."

Prior to 1979, the only high dollar tournament a person could enter was the WSOP. 1972 WSOP Main Event Champion and outspoken ambassador for poker Amarillo Slim saw this as an opportunity. "The World Series of Poker was so successful that everybody wanted more than one tournament," he said. Slim called upon his connections and friendships with poker's elite to start a new tournament in the February 1979. Before the SBOP had developed a reputation of its own, many of the most respected names in poker attended the tournament "more to support Slim and take advantage of the very fat cash games the event would obviously inspire." Slim modelled his SBOP after the WSOP with several events and a $10,000 Texas Hold'em Main Event.

One of the principal differences between the WSOP and the SBOP was the prize structure. The WSOP's prize structure was flat ensuring more people received smaller pieces of the prize pool. The SBOP typically used a 60-30-10 payout structure. In other words, only the first three places received money and generally in the ratio of 60% to first place, 30% to second place, and 10% to third. This payment schedule predominated the SBOP for the first 5 years of the event, but as the event grew the number of payouts increased while keeping the payout schedule top heavy.

== 1990 Tournament ==
The 1990 SBOP had arguably one of the toughest final tables ever assembled. Four of the final six players (Jack Keller, Stu Ungar, T. J. Cloutier, and Chip Reese) have all been inducted into the Poker Hall of Fame. A fifth player, Hamid Dastmalchi won the WSOP Main Event in 1992. Between the five of them, they have acquired 20 WSOP bracelets. T. J. Cloutier did at the SBOP what he has failed to do at the WSOP, despite making 4 WSOP Main Event Final tables, by winning the SBOP Main Event. Billy Baxter won the Deuce To Seven Lowball. Deuce to Seven is the format type where Baxter has won five WSOP bracelets. Baxter had finished in second place in various SBOP Deuce to Seven Lowball five times and third once.

Hoyt Corkins a two time bracelet and one time World Poker Tour winner won his first major tournament at the 1990 SBOP.

== Key ==
*	Elected to the Poker Hall of Fame.
†	Denotes player who is deceased.
Place	The place in which people finish.
Name	The name of the player
Prize (US$)	Event prize money

=== Event 1: $ 400 7 Card Stud (Ladies) ===
- Number of buy-ins: 63
- Total prize pool: $19,680
- Number of payouts: 18

Final table
Place	Name	Prize
1st	Marsha Waggoner	$9,600
2nd	Linda Ryke-Drucker	$6,000
3rd	Liz Jameson	$2,400
4th	Glenda Bridges	$1,680

=== Event 2: $ 500 Limit Hold'em ===
- Number of buy-ins: 292
- Total prize pool: Unknown
- Number of payouts: 5

Final table
Place	Name	Prize
1st	Fred Sigur	$58,400
2nd	Jose Rosenkrantz	$29,200
3rd	Bob Ensley	$14,600
4th	David Stone	$8,760
5th	Howard Berger	$7,300

=== Event 3: $ 500 Limit 7 Card Stud ===
- Number of buy-ins: 268
- Total prize pool: Unknown
- Number of payouts: Unknown

Final table
Place	Name	Prize
1st	Ester Rossi	$53,600
2nd	Paul Kornelly	$26,800
3rd	Alex Murray	$13,400
4th	Mike Berry	$8,040
5th	Michael Simon	$6,700

=== Event 4: $ 1,000 7 Card Stud Hi/Lo ===
- Number of buy-ins: 119
- Total prize pool: $119,000
- Number of payouts: Unknown

Final table
Place	Name	Prize
1st	Gene Fisher	$47,600
2nd	Artie Cobb	$23,800
3rd	Sam Grizzle	$11,900
4th	John Yarmosh	$7,140
5th	Jeff Campbell	$5,950
6th	Bud Moore	$4,760

=== Event 5: $ 1,000 7 Card Razz ===
- Number of buy-ins: 119
- Total prize pool: $119,000
- Number of payouts: Unknown

Final table
Place	Name	Prize
1st	John Cover	$41,600
2nd	Johnny Moss*	$26,000
3rd	Steve Edelson	$10,000
4th	Mike Markos	$7,280
5th	Don Zewin	$6,240
6th	Mike Sexton	$5,200

=== Event : $ 200 Pot Limit Omaha with Rebuys ===
- Number of buy-ins: Unknown
- Total prize pool: Unknown
- Number of payouts: Unknown

Final table
Place	Name	Prize
1st	Ron Stanley	$72,160
2nd	Lyle Berman*	$36,080
3rd	Rodger Hutchinson	$18,040
4th	Johnny Chan*	$10,824
5th	Ken Flaton	$9,020

=== Event 7: $ 1,000 7 Card Stud ===
- Number of buy-ins: 140
- Total prize pool: $140,000
- Number of payouts: Unknown

Final table
Place	Name	Prize
1st	Artie Cobb	$55,600
2nd	John Agliolora	$27,800
3rd	Dewey Tomko*	$13,900
4th	Don Zewin	$13,900
5th	Tommy Fischer	$8,340

=== Event 8: $ 200 No Limit Hold'em with Rebuys ===
- Number of buy-ins: 219
- Total prize pool: $220,300
- Number of payouts: 6

Final table
Place	Name	Prize
1st	John Spadavecchia	$88,120
2nd	Lyle Berman*	$44,060
3rd	Bill Smith	$22,030
4th	Humberto Brenes	$16,025
5th	Scott Johnson	$11,015
6th	Max Stern	$7,710

=== Event 9: $ 1,000 Limit Hold'em ===
- Number of buy-ins: 170
- Total prize pool: $170,000
- Number of payouts: 18

Final table
Place	Name	Prize
1st	Ron Stanley	$68,000
2nd	Tommy Fischer	$34,000
3rd	Ronald Ross	$17,000
4th	Tony Thang	$10,200
5th	Mickey Finn	$8,500
6th	Barney O'Malia	$5,950
7th	Humberto Brenes	$5,100
8th	Tommy Grimes	$3,400
9th	John Spadavecchia	$2,550

=== Event 10: $ 200 Limit Omaha with Rebuys ===
- Number of buy-ins: 166
- Total prize pool: Unknown
- Number of payouts: 18

Final table
Place	Name	Prize
1st	Hoyt Corkins	$65,680
2nd	Jack Keller*	$32,840
3rd	David Baxter	$16,420
4th	Stan Johnson	$9,852
5th	Vasillis Lazarou	$8,210
6th	John Cernuto	$5,747
7th	Tony Thang	$4,926
8th	Roger Moore	$3,284
9th	Brent Carter	$2,463

=== Event 11: $ 1,500 Limit 7 Card Stud ===
- Number of buy-ins: 102
- Total prize pool: $153,000
- Number of payouts: 16

Final table
Place	Name	Prize
1st	Cyndy Arynn	$61,200
2nd	Jimmy Athanas	$30,600
3rd	Don Williams	$15,300
4th	Flan Pikington	$9,180
5th	Mike Hart	$7,650
6th	Alan Boston	$6,120
7th	Harry Thomas	$4,590
8th	Robert Miller	$3,060
9th	Unknown	$2,225

=== Event 11: Deuce To 7 Lowball ===
- Number of buy-ins: 18
- Total prize pool: $87,500
- Number of payouts: 4

Final table
Place	Name	Prize
1st	Billy Baxter*	$43,750
2nd	Roger Van Driesen	$21,875
3rd	Rick Riolo	$13,125
4th	John Bonetti	$8,750

=== Event 12: $ 10,000 No Limit Hold'em ===
- Number of buy-ins: 48
- Total prize pool: $480,000
- Number of payouts: 7

Final table
Place	Name	Prize
1st	T. J. Cloutier*	$240,000
2nd	Jack Keller*	$96,000
3rd	Stu Ungar*	$48,000
4th	Richardo Alem-Simon	$31,200
5th	Hamid Dastmalchi	$26,400
6th	Chip Reese*	$21,600
7th	Jim Doman	$16,800
