= 1991 Super Bowl of Poker =

Poker tournament

The Super Bowl of Poker (also known as Amarillo Slim's Super Bowl of Poker or SBOP) was the second most prestigious poker tournament in the world during the 1980s. While the World Series of Poker was already drawing larger crowds as more and more amateurs sought it out, the SBOP "was an affair limited almost exclusively to pros and hard-core amateurs."

The 1991 Tournament was the last SBOP. After Caesar's Casino in Las Vegas closed its poker room, Amarillo Slim had to find a new location for the event and the best deal that he could find forced participants to drive two hours. This resulted in the smallest SBOP fields ever; the Main Event only had 12 participants. Because of the small size of the field, fewer people were paid than in previous tournaments and the prestige of winning the events suffered a setback that doomed the SBOP and made 1991 the last year for the tournament.

The winners of the tournament, however, continued to represent some of the biggest names in poker. Barbara Enright, the only woman in the Poker Hall of Fame, won the ladies event. Jack Keller, another Hall of Famer, won two events, the $1,000 Pot Limit Omaha and the $10,000 Main Event. Having won the event in 1984, this was his second time to have won the $10,000 Main Event.

Prior to SBOP, the only high dollar tournament a person could enter was the WSOP. "The World Series of Poker was so successful that everybody wanted more than one tournament," Amarillo Slim said. Slim called upon his connections and friendships with poker's elite to start a new tournament in February 1979. Before the SBOP had developed a reputation of its own, many of the most respected names in poker attended the tournament "more to support Slim and take advantage of the very fat cash games the event would obviously inspire." Slim modelled his SBOP after the WSOP with several events and a $10,000 Texas Hold'em Main Event.

One of the principal differences between the WSOP and the SBOP was the prize structure. The WSOP's prize structure was flat, ensuring more people received smaller pieces of the prize pool. The SBOP typically used a 60-30-10 payout structure. In other words, only the first three places received money and generally in the ratio of 60% to first place, 30% to second place, and 10% to third. This payment schedule dominated in the SBOP for the first 5 years of the event, but as the event grew the number of payouts increased while keeping the payout schedule top heavy.

== Key ==
*	Elected to the Poker Hall of Fame.
†	Denotes player who is deceased.
Place	The place in which people finish.
Name	The name of the player
Prize (US$)	Event prize money

=== Event 1: $500 Limit Hold'em ===
- Number of buy-ins: 145
- Total prize pool: $72,500
- Number of payouts: 18

Final table
Place	Name	Prize
1st	Buster Jackson	$29,000
2nd	Bill Nelson	$14,500
3rd	Dave Anderson	$7,250
4th	Paul Sherr	$4,713
5th	John Stephanian	$3,625
6th	Tom Fisher	$2,538
7th	J.C. Pearson	$1,812
8th	Todd Brunson	$1,450
9th	Ed Gar	$1,087

=== Event 2: $500 Limit Omaha ===
- Number of buy-ins: 79
- Total prize pool: $39,500
- Number of payouts: 9

Final table
Place	Name	Prize
1st	Marlon De Los Santos	$15,800
2nd	Jim Doman	$9,875
3rd	Joe Holmes	$3,950
4th	John Cernuto	$2,765
5th	Raymond Mancini	$2,173
6th	Luc Delrieu	$1,778
7th	Al Hauck	$1,382
8th	Mike Sexton	$987
9th	Amarillo Slim*	$790

=== Event 3: $500 Limit Seven Card Stud ===
- Number of buy-ins: 99
- Total prize pool: $49,500
- Number of payouts: 8

Final table
Place	Name	Prize
1st	Rich Korbin	$19,800
2nd	John Andiovec	$12,375
3rd	Chuck McCormick	$4,950
4th	Bob Addington	$3,465
5th	Tommy Hugnagle	$2,970
6th	Eric Drache	$2,475
7th	Jim Doman	$1,980
8th	Dave Anderson	$1,485

=== Event 4: $1,000 Limit Ace To Five Lowball ===
- Number of buy-ins: 29
- Total prize pool: $29,000
- Number of payouts: 8

Final table
Place	Name	Prize
1st	John Bonetti	$11,600
2nd	Bruce Coons	$7,250
3rd	Billy Baxter*	$2,900
4th	Fred Sigur	$2,030
5th	Ed Pellegrini	$1,740
6th	Don Zewin	$1,450
7th	Bob Pendergast	$1,160
8th	Wayne Sharpe	$870

=== Event 5: $1,000 Limit Omaha Hi/Lo ===
- Number of buy-ins: 55
- Total prize pool: $55,000
- Number of payouts: 9

Final table
Place	Name	Prize
1st	Tommy Hufnagle	$22,000
2nd	John Cernuto	$13,700
3rd	Ernie Ostreicher	$5,500
4th	Gene Fisher	$3,850
5th	Amarillo Slim*	$3,025
6th	Brad Nadell	$2,475
7th	Jim Doman	$1,925
8th	Bret Carter	$1,375
9th	Joel Cohn	$1,100

=== Event 5: $1,000 Seven Card Stud Hi/Lo ===
- Number of buy-ins: 36
- Total prize pool: $36,000
- Number of payouts: 8

Final table
Place	Name	Prize
1st	Ed Pellegrini	$14,400
2nd	Ralph Hoots	$9,000
3rd	K Rusi	$3,600
4th	David Brody	$2,520
5th	Brian Nadell	$2,160
6th	George Feher	$1,800
7th	Ed Clemente	$1,440
8th	Ed Gallant	$1,080

=== Event 6: $ 1,000 Pot Limit Omaha ===
- Number of buy-ins: 38
- Total prize pool: $38,000
- Number of payouts: 9

Final table
Place	Name	Prize
1st	Jack Keller*	$15,200
2nd	Amarillo Slim*	$9,500
3rd	Luc Delrieu	$3,800
4th	Hans Lund	$2,660
5th	Paul Sherr	$2,090
6th	Gene Fisher	$1,710
7th	Surinder Sunar	$1,330
8th	Jack Culp	$950
9th	Bob Ciaffone	$760

=== Event 7: $1,000 Limit Seven Card Razz ===
- Number of buy-ins: 28
- Total prize pool: $28,000
- Number of payouts: 4

Final table
Place	Name	Prize
1st	John Cernuto	$14,000
2nd	Brian Nadell	$7,000
3rd	Morris Kessler	$4,200
4th	Richard Schwartz	$2,800

=== Event 8: $1,000 Limit Hold'em ===
- Number of buy-ins: 57
- Total prize pool: $57,000
- Number of payouts: 9

Final table
Place	Name	Prize
1st	Rick Riolo	$22,800
2nd	Ed Edmundson	$14,250
3rd	Hoyt Corkins	$5,700
4th	Mike Laing	$3,990
5th	Al Korsin	$3,135
6th	Ralph Levine	$2,565
7th	Susy Thunder	$1,995
8th	Don Williams	$1,425
9th	Dave Anderson	$1,140

=== Event 9: $1,000 Limit Omaha ===
- Number of buy-ins: 30
- Total prize pool: $30,000
- Number of payouts: 5

Final table
Place	Name	Prize
1st	Elmer Thomas	$13,500
2nd	Frank Henderson	$7,500
3rd	Gene Fisher	$4,500
4th	Bob Ciaffone	$3,000
5th	Jack Culp	$1,500

=== Event 10: $1,000 Limit Seven Card Stud ===
- Number of buy-ins: 31
- Total prize pool: $31,000
- Number of payouts: 5

Final table
Place	Name	Prize
1st	Mori Eskand	$13,950
2nd	Gail Ross	$7,750
3rd	Fred Sigur	$4,650
4th	Harvey Krendel	$3,100
5th	Alma McClelland	$1,550

=== Event 11: $1,500 Limit Hold'em ===
- Number of buy-ins: 43
- Total prize pool: $64,500
- Number of payouts: 9

Final table
Place	Name	Prize
1st	Bill O'Connor	$25,800
2nd	John Bonetti	$16,125
3rd	Todd Brunson	$6,450
4th	Hal Kant	$4,515
5th	Allan Stonum	$3,548
6th	Frank Henderson	$2,903
7th	Amarillo Slim*	$2,257
8th	T. J. Cloutier*	$1,612
9th	Dan Sargent	$1,290

=== Event 12: $2,500 No-Limit Deuce To Seven Lowball with Rebuys ===
- Number of buy-ins: Not Recorded
- Total prize pool: Not Recorded
- Number of payouts: Not Recorded

=== Event 13: $1,500 Limit Hold'em ===
- Number of buy-ins: 34
- Total prize pool: $51,000
- Number of payouts: 5

Final table
Place	Name	Prize
1st	Mike Laing	$22,950
2nd	T. J. Cloutier*	$12,750
3rd	Jim Doman	$7,650
4th	Mike Sexton	$5,100
5th	Fred Sigur	$2,550

=== Event 14: $400 Seven Card Stud (Ladies) ===
- Number of buy-ins: 13
- Total prize pool: $5,200
- Number of payouts: 5

Final table
Place	Name	Prize
1st	Barbara Enright*	$2,860
2nd	Alma McClelland	$1,560
3rd	Patricia Puckett	$780

=== Event 15: $10,000 No-Limit Hold'em ===
- Number of buy-ins: 12
- Total prize pool: $95,000
- Number of payouts: 3

Final table
Place	Name	Prize
1st	Jack Keller*	$52,250
2nd	Berry Johnston*	$28,500
3rd	B Parrott	$14,250
