= 1988 Super Bowl of Poker =

Poker tournament

The Super Bowl of Poker (also known as Amarillo Slim's Super Bowl of Poker or SBOP) was the second most prestigious poker tournament in the world during the 1980s. While the World Series of Poker was already drawing larger crowds as more and more amateurs sought it out, the SBOP "was an affair limited almost exclusively to pros and hard-core amateurs."

Prior to 1979, the only high dollar tournament a person could enter was the WSOP. 1972 WSOP Main Event Champion and outspoken ambassador for poker Amarillo Slim saw this as an opportunity. "The World Series of Poker was so successful that everybody wanted more than one tournament," he said. Slim called upon his connections and friendships with poker's elite to start a new tournament in the February 1979. Before the SBOP had developed a reputation of its own, many of the most respected names in poker attended the tournament "more to support Slim and take advantage of the very fat cash games the event would obviously inspire." Slim modelled his SBOP after the WSOP with several events and a $10,000 Texas Hold'em Main Event.

One of the principal differences between the WSOP and the SBOP was the prize structure. The WSOP's prize structure was flat ensuring more people received smaller pieces of the prize pool. The SBOP typically used a 60-30-10 payout structure. In other words, only the first three places received money and generally in the ratio of 60% to first place, 30% to second place, and 10% to third. This payment schedule predominated the SBOP for the first 5 years of the event, but as the event grew the number of payouts increased while keeping the payout schedule top heavy.

== 1988 Tournament ==
The 1988 SBOP was possibly one of the most notable years in the tournament's history. Two future Poker Hall of Famer's Stu Ungar and Jack Keller were playing heads-up for the right to claim the title. Stu won the event and went on to become the only person to win three SBOP Main Events. The loser, Jack Keller, ended up winning two SBOP Main Events. The Main Event was not the only final table that Jack made it to in 1988. Jack faced off against another future Poker Hall of Famer at the $1,000 Ace to Five Draw tournament. This time he fell short to Chip Reese.

== Key ==
*	Elected to the Poker Hall of Fame.
Place	The place in which people finish.
Name	The name of the player
Prize (US$)	Event prize money

=== Event 1: $ 10,000 No Limit Hold'em ===
- Number of buy-ins: 42
- Total prize pool: $420,000
- Number of payouts: 7

Final table
Place	Name	Prize
1st	Stu Ungar*	$210,000
2nd	Jack Keller*	$84,000
3rd	Don Williams	$42,000
4th	David Baxter	$21,000
5th	Perry Green	$21,000
6th	Ricardo Alem-Simon	$21,000
7th	Jose Rosenkrantz	$21,000

=== Event 2: $ 500 Limit Hold'em ===
- Number of buy-ins: 156
- Total prize pool: $78,000
- Number of payouts: 8

Final table
Place	Name	Prize
1st	Robert Turner	$38,000
2nd	Eric Treichel	$15,200
3rd	Earl Kim	$7,600
4th	Michael Halford	$3,800
5th	Stan Singer	$3,800
6th	Ken Flaton	$3,800
7th	Johnny Hale	$3,800
8th	John Fallon	$2,000

=== Event 3: $ 1,000 Ace to Five Draw ===
- Number of buy-ins: 50
- Total prize pool: $50,000
- Number of payouts: 5

Final table
Place	Name	Prize
1st	Chip Reese*	$25,000
2nd	Ray Rumler	$12,500
3rd	Pat Flanagan	$7,500
4th	Jack Keller*	$5,000
5th	Jack Lewis	$2,500

=== Event 4: $ 500 Limit Seven Card Stud ===
- Number of buy-ins: 152
- Total prize pool: $76,000
- Number of payouts: 10

Final table
Place	Name	Prize
1st	Jim Brenner	$36,000
2nd	Barbara Gold	$14,400
3rd	Wallace Phipps	$7,200
4th	Said Barjestch	$3,600
5th	Robert Miller	$3,600
6th	Jack Shirley	$3,600
7th	Karen Wolfson	$3,600
8th	Jack Lewis	$2,000
9th	Ken Flaton	$1,000
10th	Johnny Moss*	$1,000

=== Event 5: $ 200 Pot Limit Omaha ===
- Number of buy-ins: 607
- Total prize pool: $121,400
- Number of payouts: 10

Final table
Place	Name	Prize
1st	John King	$54,180
2nd	Seymour Leibowitz	$25,080
3rd	Ron Graham	$12,040
4th	George Tsiklitiras	$6,020
5th	Ed Edmonson	$6,020
6th	David Baxter	$6,020
7th	Mike Hart	$6,020
8th	Don Williams	$3,010
9th	Artie Cobb	$3,010

=== Event 6: $ 1,000 Limit Seven Card Stud Hi/Lo ===
- Number of buy-ins: Unknown
- Total prize pool: $55,800
- Number of payouts: 10

Final table
Place	Name	Prize
1st	Marty Sigel	$46,500
2nd	Al Korsin	$9,300

=== Event 7: $ 200 No Limit Hold'em ===
- Number of buy-ins: Unknown
- Total prize pool: $161,400
- Number of payouts: 9

Final table
Place	Name	Prize
1st	Ricardo Alem-Simon	$72,585
2nd	Men Nguyen	$32,260
3rd	Tony Abadi	$16,130
4th	Eldon Elias	$8,065
5th	Dewey Tomko*	$8,065
6th	Tom Franklin	$8,065
7th	Al Korsin	$8,065
8th	Eddie Schwettmann	$4,032
9th	George Rodis	$4,032

=== Event 8: $ 500 Limit Hold'em ===
- Number of buy-ins: 161
- Total prize pool: $80,500
- Number of payouts: 9

Final table
Place	Name	Prize
1st	Doug Roche	$36,225
2nd	Ray Rumler	$16,100
3rd	Lauri Foreman	$8,050
4th	Humberto Brenes	$4,025
5th	Al Korsin	$4,025
6th	Tony Thang	$4,025
7th	T. J. Cloutier	$4,025
8th	Hector Williams	$2,013
9th	Don Thrash	$2,013

=== Event 9: $ 1,000 Limit Seven Card Stud ===
- Number of buy-ins: Unknown
- Total prize pool: $58,000
- Number of payouts: 1

Final table
Place	Name	Prize
1st	John Cernuto	$58,000

=== Event 10: $ 2,500 No Limit 2-7 Draw ===
- Number of buy-ins: Unknown
- Total prize pool: $71,250
- Number of payouts: 1

Final table
Place	Name	Prize
1st	Carl Rouss	$71,250

=== Event 11: $ 200 Pot Limit Omaha ===
- Number of buy-ins: Unknown
- Total prize pool: $60,975
- Number of payouts: 1

Final table
Place	Name	Prize
1st	Ralph Morton	$60,975

=== Event 12:$ 1,000 No Limit Hold'em ===
- Number of buy-ins: 135
- Total prize pool: $135,000
- Number of payouts: 9

Final table
Place	Name	Prize
1st	Don Holt	$60,750
2nd	George Rodis	$27,000
3rd	Jens Nielsen	$13,500
4th	Yosh Nakano	$6,750
5th	Brad Daugherty	$6,750
6th	Perry Green	$6,750
7th	Harve Morgan	$6,750
8th	Scott Mayfield	$3,375
9th	David Baxter	$3,375
