= 1986 Super Bowl of Poker =

Poker tournament

The Super Bowl of Poker (also known as Amarillo Slim's Super Bowl of Poker or SBOP) was the second most prestigious poker tournament in the world during the 1980s. While the World Series of Poker was already drawing larger crowds as more and more amateurs sought it out, the SBOP "was an affair limited almost exclusively to pros and hard-core amateurs."

Prior to 1979, the only high dollar tournament a person could enter was the WSOP. 1972 WSOP Main Event Champion and outspoken ambassador for poker Amarillo Slim saw this as an opportunity. "The World Series of Poker was so successful that everybody wanted more than one tournament," he said. Slim called upon his connections and friendships with poker's elite to start a new tournament in February 1979. Before the SBOP had developed a reputation of its own, many of the most respected names in poker attended the tournament "more to support Slim and take advantage of the very fat cash games the event would obviously inspire." Slim modelled his SBOP after the WSOP with several events and a $10,000 Texas Hold'em Main Event.

One of the principal differences between the WSOP and the SBOP was the prize structure. The WSOP's prize structure was flat ensuring more people received smaller pieces of the prize pool. The SBOP typically used a 60-30-10 payout structure. In other words, only the first three places received money and generally in the ratio of 60% to first place, 30% to second place, and 10% to third. This payment schedule predominated the SBOP for the first 5 years of the event, but as the event grew the number of payouts increased while keeping the payout schedule top heavy.

== 1986 Tournament ==
Jack Keller, a member of the Poker Hall of Fame, won the Pot Limit Omaha in the 1986 SBOP. But it was the Deuce-to-Seven Lowball event that may have had the toughest final three competitors ever. Doyle Brunson, a Poker Hall of Famer, has won ten WSOP bracelets and won this event. In order to win, he had to defeat two other Poker Hall Famers. Billy Baxter, who owns 7 bracelets, came in second place while Johnny Chan, the third-place finisher, is tied with Doyle for the second most bracelets at 10. T. J. Cloutier, another member of the Hall, and Jack Keller both won separate $500 Limit Hold'em events.

== Key ==
*	Elected to the Poker Hall of Fame.
Place	The place in which people finish.
Name	The name of the player
Prize (US$)	Event prize money

=== Event 1: $500 Limit Hold'em ===
- Number of buy-ins: 164
- Total prize pool: $82,000
- Number of payouts: 7

Final table
Place	Name	Prize
1st	Jack Keller*	$41,000
2nd	Eddie Schwettman	$16,400
3rd	Ralph Morton	$8,200
4th	John Esposito	$4,100
5th	Ronnie Willis	$4,100
6th	Charles Wright	$4,100
7th	Mike Catherwood	$4,100

=== Event 2: $1,000 Ace-to-Five Lowball ===
- Number of buy-ins: 45
- Total prize pool: $45,000
- Number of payouts: Unknown

Final table
Place	Name	Prize
1st	Dale Conway	$23,000
2nd	Brad Martin	$9,200

=== Event 3: 7 Card Stud ===
- Number of buy-ins: 45
- Total prize pool: $45,000
- Number of payouts: Unknown

Final table
Place	Name	Prize
1st	John Yarmosh	$21,500
2nd	Eugene Lang	$8,600

=== Event 4: $500 Limit Hold'em ===
- Number of buy-ins: 97
- Total prize pool: $48,500
- Number of payouts: Unknown

Final table
Place	Name	Prize
1st	T. J. Cloutier*	$24,250
2nd	AJ Jackson	$9,700

=== Event 5: $500 Omaha ===
- Number of buy-ins: Unknown
- Total prize pool: Unknown
- Number of payouts: Unknown

Final table
Place	Name	Prize
1st	Jay Heimowitz	$13,500
2nd	Bernie Salter	$5,400

=== Event 6: Seven-Card Stud ===
- Number of buy-ins: Unknown
- Total prize pool: Unknown
- Number of payouts: Unknown

Final table
Place	Name	Prize
1st	Don Williams	$14,400
2nd	Norman Jay	$7,200

=== Event 7: Deuce-to-Seven Lowball ===
- Number of buy-ins: Unknown
- Total prize pool: Unknown
- Number of payouts: Unknown

Final table
Place	Name	Prize
1st	Doyle Brunson*	$43,500
2nd	Billy Baxter*	$21,750
3rd	Johnny Chan*	$7,250

=== Event 8: $200 No Limit Hold'em ===
- Number of buy-ins: Unknown
- Total prize pool: Unknown
- Number of payouts: Unknown

Final table
Place	Name	Prize
1st	Bill Smith	$51,200
2nd	Jesse Alto	$20,400
2nd	Jack Lindsay	$10,240

=== Event 9: $2,500 7 Card Stud Hi/Lo ===
- Number of buy-ins: Unknown
- Total prize pool: Unknown
- Number of payouts: Unknown

Final table
Place	Name	Prize
1st	Bob Massie	$24,000
2nd	Chuck Sharp	$12,000

=== Event 10: Pot Limit Omaha ===
- Number of buy-ins: Unknown
- Total prize pool: Unknown
- Number of payouts: Unknown

Final table
Place	Name	Prize
1st	Bob Massie	$24,000
2nd	unknown	unknown
3rd	unknown	unknown
4th	unknown	unknown
5th	Betty Carey	$7,750

=== Event 11: $1,000 Hold'em ===
- Number of buy-ins: Unknown
- Total prize pool: Unknown
- Number of payouts: Unknown

Final table
Place	Name	Prize
1st	Mickey Appelbaum	$77,500
2nd	Bill Stewart	$18,200

=== Event 12: $10,000 No Limit Hold'em ===
- Number of buy-ins: Unknown
- Total prize pool: Unknown
- Number of payouts: Unknown

Final table
Place	Name	Prize
1st	Billy T. Walters	$175,000
2nd	Richard Klamian	$70,000
3rd	Dale Conway	$35,000
4th	Al Ethier	$17,500
5th	Jay Heimowitz	$17,500
6th	Louis Hunsucker	$17,500
7th	Junior Prejean	$17,500
8th	Roger Van Ausdall	$17,500
9th	Chip Reese*	$17,500
