= 1985 Super Bowl of Poker =

Poker tournament

The Super Bowl of Poker (also known as Amarillo Slim's Super Bowl of Poker or SBOP) was the second most prestigious poker tournament in the world during the 1980s. While the World Series of Poker was already drawing larger crowds as more and more amateurs sought it out, the SBOP "was an affair limited almost exclusively to pros and hard-core amateurs."

Prior to 1979, the only high dollar tournament a person could enter was the WSOP. 1972 WSOP Main Event Champion and outspoken ambassador for poker Amarillo Slim saw this as an opportunity. "The World Series of Poker was so successful that everybody wanted more than one tournament," he said. Slim called upon his connections and friendships with poker's elite to start a new tournament in the February 1979. Before the SBOP had developed a reputation of its own, many of the most respected names in poker attended the tournament "more to support Slim and take advantage of the very fat cash games the event would obviously inspire." Slim modeled his SBOP after the WSOP with several events and a $10,000 Texas Hold'em Main Event.

One of the principal differences between the WSOP and the SBOP was the prize structure. The WSOP's prize structure was flat ensuring more people received smaller pieces of the prize pool. The SBOP typically used a 60-30-10 payout structure. In other words, only the first three places received money and generally in the ratio of 60% to first place, 30% to second place, and 10% to third. This payment schedule predominated the SBOP for the first 5 years of the event, but as the event grew the number of payouts increased while keeping the payout schedule top heavy.

== 1985 Tournament ==
Poker Hall of Famers Chip Reese and Billy Baxter both made runs at various titles, but neither succeeded in winning their events. The only member to win a tournament that year was Johnny Chan in the $1,000 Omaha event. In order to win the title, he had to defeat two other Hall of Fame caliber players in Dewey Tomko who was inducted into the Hall in 2008 and 1993 recipient Jack Keller. Tomko went on to win the $5,000 Seven-Card Stud event.

== Key ==
| * | Elected to the Poker Hall of Fame. |
| Place | The place in which people finish. |
| Name | The name of the player |
| Prize (US$) | Event prize money |

=== Event 1: $400 Ladies 7 Card Stud ===
- Number of buy-ins: 44
- Total prize pool: $17,600
- Number of payouts: 7

Final table
| Place | Name | Prize |
|---|---|---|
| 1st | Kimberly Bye | $8,880 |
| 2nd | Betty Wagner | $3,520 |
| 3rd | Elsie Brent | $1,760 |
| 4th | Starla Brodie | $880 |
| 5th | Cyndy Violette | $880 |
| 6th | Lucy Bowman | $880 |
| 7th | Cheryl Davis | $880 |

=== Event 2: $500 Limit Hold'em ===
- Number of buy-ins: 207
- Total prize pool: $103,500
- Number of payouts: 7

Final table
| Place | Name | Prize |
|---|---|---|
| 1st | Rich Quakenbush | $51,750 |
| 2nd | Mark Stropko | $20,700 |
| 3rd | Dody Roach | $10,350 |
| 4th | Mike Stoltz | $5,175 |
| 5th | Dave Walden | $5,175 |
| 6th | Peter Etchemendy | $5,175 |
| 7th | Andy Myerson | $5,175 |

=== Event 3: $1,000 Ace-to-Five Lowball ===
- Number of buy-ins: 53
- Total prize pool: $53,000
- Number of payouts: 7

Final table
| Place | Name | Prize |
|---|---|---|
| 1st | Greg Wagner | $26,500 |
| 2nd | T. J. Cloutier* | $10,000 |
| 3rd | Robert Hunter | $5,300 |
| 4th | John Serpa | $2,650 |
| 5th | Dennis Horvath | $2,650 |
| 6th | Johnny Hale | $2,650 |
| 7th | Phil Morgan | $2,650 |

=== Event 4: $500 7 Card Stud ===
- Number of buy-ins: 89
- Total prize pool: $44,500
- Number of payouts: 7

Final table
| Place | Name | Prize |
|---|---|---|
| 1st | Cheryl Davis | $8,900 |
| 2nd | Artie Cobb | $4,450 |
| 3rd | Dino Bumbico | $2,225 |
| 4th | Gary Berland | $2,225 |
| 5th | David Holzderber | $2,650 |
| 6th | Peter Christ | $2,225 |
| 7th | Bob Ensley | $2,225 |

=== Event 5: $1,000 No Limit Hold'em ===
- Number of buy-ins: 80
- Total prize pool: $80,000
- Number of payouts: 7

Final table
| Place | Name | Prize |
|---|---|---|
| 1st | Art Youngblood | $40,000 |
| 2nd | Chip Reese* | $20,000 |
| 3rd | Frank Hunter | $2,225 |

=== Event 6: $5,000 7 Card Stud ===
- Number of buy-ins: 13
- Total prize pool: $65,000
- Number of payouts: 3

Final table
| Place | Name | Prize |
|---|---|---|
| 1st | Dewey Tomko* | $39,000 |
| 2nd | Rick Greider | $19,500 |
| 3rd | Frank Hunter | $6,500 |

=== Event 7: $2,500 Ace-to-Five Lowball ===
- Number of buy-ins: 34
- Total prize pool: $85,000
- Number of payouts: 5

Final table
| Place | Name | Prize |
|---|---|---|
| 1st | Austin Squatty | $42,500 |
| 2nd | Mike Markos | $25,500 |
| 3rd | Billy Baxter* | $8,500 |
| 4th | Rick Riolo | $4,250 |
| 5th | Seymour Liebowitz | $4,250 |

=== Event 8: $500 Omaha ===
- Number of buy-ins: 103
- Total prize pool: $51,500
- Number of payouts: 5

Final table
| Place | Name | Prize |
|---|---|---|
| 1st | Terry Fielder | $25,750 |
| 2nd | Dave Chanduloy | $10,300 |
| 3rd | Fred Bowen | $5,100 |

=== Event 9: $2,500 7 Card Stud Hi/Lo ===
- Number of buy-ins: 32
- Total prize pool: $80,000
- Number of payouts: 3

Final table
| Place | Name | Prize |
|---|---|---|
| 1st | Ken Smith | $56,000 |
| 2nd | Jeff Burdasall | $24,000 |
| 3rd | Chip Reese* | $8,000 |

=== Event 10: $1,000 Omaha ===
- Number of buy-ins: 154
- Total prize pool: $154,000
- Number of payouts: Unknown

Final table
| Place | Name | Prize |
|---|---|---|
| 1st | Johnny Chan* | $77,000 |
| 2nd | Dewey Tomko* | $46,200 |
| 3rd | Jack Keller* | $15,400 |

=== Event 11: $500 Limit Hold'em ===
- Number of buy-ins: 176
- Total prize pool: $88,000
- Number of payouts: Unknown

Final table
| Place | Name | Prize |
|---|---|---|
| 1st | Dave Keiser | $44,000 |
| 2nd | Terry Farmer | $17,600 |
| 3rd | Hal Kant | $8,800 |

=== Event 12: $5,000 Deuce-to-Seven Lowball ===
- Number of buy-ins: 24
- Total prize pool: $120,000
- Number of payouts: 3

Final table
| Place | Name | Prize |
|---|---|---|
| 1st | Gary Lundgren | $72,000 |
| 2nd | Billy Baxter* | $36,000 |
| 3rd | Jim Ray | $12,000 |

=== Event 13: $1,000 "Follow the stars" Hold'em ===
- Number of buy-ins: 157
- Total prize pool: $157,000
- Number of payouts: Unknown

Final table
| Place | Name | Prize |
|---|---|---|
| 1st | Bill Strothers | $72,000 |
| 2nd | Norman Jay | $36,000 |
| 3rd | Ray Legett | $12,000 |

=== Event 14: $10,000 Main Event - No Limit Hold'em ===
- Number of buy-ins: 41
- Total prize pool: $410,000
- Number of payouts: Unknown

Final table
| Place | Name | Prize |
|---|---|---|
| 1st | Mickey Appleman | $205,000 |
| 2nd | Dewey Tomko* | $82,000 |
| 3rd | John Esposito | $41,000 |
| 4th | Lyle Berman* | $20,500 |
| 5th | Jack Keller* | $20,500 |
| 6th | Al Ethier | $20,500 |
| 7th | Gary Lundgren | $20,500 |
