= 1982 Super Bowl of Poker =

Poker tournament series

The Super Bowl of Poker (SBOP), also known as Amarillo Slim's Super Bowl of Poker, was the second most prestigious poker tournament in the world during the 1980s. While the World Series of Poker was already drawing larger crowds as more and more amateurs sought it out, the SBOP "was an affair limited almost exclusively to pros and hard-core amateurs."

Prior to 1979, the only high dollar tournament a person could enter was the WSOP. 1972 WSOP Main Event Champion and outspoken ambassador for poker Amarillo Slim saw this as an opportunity. "The World Series of Poker was so successful that everybody wanted more than one tournament," he said. Slim called upon his connections and friendships with poker's elite to start a new tournament in the February 1979. Before the SBOP had developed a reputation of its own, many of the most respected names in poker attended the tournament "more to support Slim and take advantage of the very fat cash games the event would obviously inspire." Slim modelled his SBOP after the WSOP with several events and a $10,000 Texas Hold'em Main Event.

One of the principal differences between the WSOP and the SBOP was the prize structure. The WSOP's prize structure was flat ensuring more people received smaller pieces of the prize pool. The SBOP typically used a 60-30-10 payout structure. In other words, only the first three places received money and generally in the ratio of 60% to first place, 30% to second place, and 10% to third. This payment schedule predominated the SBOP for the first 5 years of the event, but as the event grew the number of payouts increased while keeping the payout schedule top heavy.

== 1982 tournament ==
Puggy Pearson is the Poker Hall of Famer who is credited with coming up with the concept of a freeze-out tournament. As a four-time World Series of Poker bracelet winner, Pearson was well known in poker circles. In 1982, Puggy was playing Chuck Bemus heads up in the "Follow the Stars" tournament. The "Follow the Stars" tournament was known for offering a prize equal to half the total buy-in and a new car. Pearson was one of two future Poker Hall of Famers to win a SBOP tournament in 1982; the other one was Chip Reese, who won the $10,000 Deuce to Seven Lowball event.

== Key ==
*	Elected to the Poker Hall of Fame.
†	Denotes player who is deceased.
Place	The place in which people finish.
Name	The name of the player
Prize (US$)	Event prize money

=== Event 1: Ladies Seven Card Stud ===
- Number of buy-ins: 42
- Total prize pool: $16,400
- Number of payouts: 4

Final table
Place	Name	Prize
1st	EJ Freeman	$9,840
2nd	Lanette Rocheleau	$4,920
3rd	Alma McClelland†	$1,640

=== Event 2: Ace to Five Lowball ===
- Number of buy-ins: Unknown
- Total prize pool: $43200
- Number of payouts: 2

Final table
Place	Name	Prize
1st	Howard Andrew	$28,800
2nd	Seymour Leibowitz	$14,400

=== Event 3: $ 500 Seven Card Stud ===
- Number of buy-ins: 64
- Total prize pool: $32,000
- Number of payouts: 3

Final table
Place	Name	Prize
1st	Howard Andrew	$19,200
2nd	Phil Glessner	$9,600
3rd	Dick Faucette	$3,200

=== Event 4: $ 500 Limit Hold'em ===
- Number of buy-ins: 197
- Total prize pool: $99,500
- Number of payouts: 3

Final table
Place	Name	Prize
1st	Dave Bailey	$59,700
2nd	Robert "Chip Burner" Turner	$29,850
3rd	Johnny Chan	$9,950

=== Event 5: $ 5,000 Seven Card Stud ===
- Number of buy-ins: 13
- Total prize pool: $65,000
- Number of payouts: 3

Final table
Place	Name	Prize
1st	Sam Mastrogiannis	$39,000
2nd	Bobby Baldwin*	$19,500
3rd	Hugh Nevill	$6,500

=== Event 6: Ace to Five Lowball ===
- Number of buy-ins: Unknown
- Total prize pool: $65,000
- Number of payouts: 3

Final table
Place	Name	Prize
1st	Dave Hampton	$39,000
2nd	Perry Green	$19,500
3rd	David Baxter	$6,500

=== Event 7: $ 10,000 Deuce to Seven Lowball ===
- Number of buy-ins: 14
- Total prize pool: $140,000
- Number of payouts: 3

Final table
Place	Name	Prize
1st	Chip Reese†*	$84,000
2nd	Richard Clayton	$42,000
3rd	Frank Mariani	$14,000

=== Event 8: $ 1,000 Hold'em ===
- Number of buy-ins: 96
- Total prize pool: $96,000
- Number of payouts: 3

Final table
Place	Name	Prize
1st	Tom McEvoy	$57,600
2nd	Tom Hood	$28,800
3rd	Howard Andrew	$9,600

=== Event 9: $ 2,500 Seven Card Stud Hi/Lo Split ===
- Number of buy-ins: Unknown
- Total prize pool: $60,000
- Number of payouts: 3

Final table
Place	Name	Prize
1st	Darryl Smith	$36,000
2nd	Mickey Appleman	$18,000
3rd	Robert Travis	$6,000

=== Event 10: $ 1,000 Hold'em - Follow the Stars ===
- Number of buy-ins: Unknown
- Total prize pool: $120,000
- Number of payouts: 3

Final table
Place	Name	Prize
1st	Puggy Pearson†*	$75,000
2nd	Chuck Bemus	$30,000
3rd	Walter Jones	$15,000

=== Event 11: $ 10,000 No Limit Hold'em ===
- Number of buy-ins: unknown
- Total prize pool: $495,000
- Number of payouts: 4

Final table
Place	Name	Prize
1st	Ed Stevens	$195,000
2nd	Tony Salinas	$117,000
3rd	Gabe Kaplan	$105,000
4th	Chuck Bemus	$78,000
