= 1984 World Series of Poker =

Series of poker tournaments

- Location: Binion's Horseshoe, Las Vegas, Nevada
- Dates: May 1 – 19

Champion
- (United States) Jack Keller

The 1984 World Series of Poker (WSOP) was a series of poker tournaments held at Binion's Horseshoe.

== Events ==
There were 13 preliminary events at the 1984 World Series of Poker. 11 of the 13 preliminary events, including the first ten, were awarded to the first-time bracelet winners.

#	Date	Event	Entries	Winner	Prize	Runner-up	Results
1	May 1, 1984	$1,000 No Limit Hold'em	234	Dick Albano (1/1)	$117,000	Bobby Hoff	Results
2	May 2, 1984	$1,500 No Limit Hold'em	178	Todd Baur (1/1)	$133,500	Dean Williams	Results
3	May 3, 1984	$1,000 Pot Limit Omaha (with Rebuy)	108	William Bennett (1/1)	$84,000	David Sklansky (0/3)	Results
4	May 4, 1984	$1,000 Seven Card Stud Split	120	Norman Berliner (1/1)	$50,000	David Holzderber	Results
5	May 5, 1984	$1,000 Ace to Five Draw	109	Paul Fontaine (1/1)	$54,500	David Baxter (0/1)	Results
6	May 6, 1984	$1,000 Seven Card Razz	80	Mike Hart (1/1)	$40,000	David Singer	Results
7	May 7, 1984	$5,000 Seven Card Stud	55	Jack Keller (1/1)	$137,500	Harry Thomas	Results
8	May 8, 1984	$1,000 Employee Event - No Limit Hold'em	14	Sandy Stupak (1/1)	$14,000	Unknown	Results
9	May 9, 1984	$1,000 Limit Hold'em	270	Bob Martinez (1/1)	$135,000	Jerry Todd	Results
10	May 10, 1984	$1,000 Seven Card Stud	132	Mike Schneiberg (1/1)	$65,000	Norman Jay	Results
11	May 11, 1984	$10,000 Deuce to Seven Draw	21	Dewey Tomko (1/2)	$105,000	Sam Angel (0/2)	Results
12	May 12, 1984	$5,000 Pot Limit Omaha	22	Dewey Tomko (2/3)	$135,000	Roger Moore	Results
13	May 13, 1984	$500 Ladies' Seven Card Stud	62	Karen Wolfson (1/1)	$15,500	Marsha Waggoner	Results
14	May 14, 1984	$10,000 No Limit Hold'em Main Event	132	Jack Keller (2/2)	$660,000	Byron Wolford	Results

== Main Event ==
There were 132 entrants to the main event. Each paid $10,000 to enter the tournament, with the top 9 players finishing in the money. The 1984 Main Event was the first of three consecutive final table appearances for Jesse Alto. Jack Keller defeated Byron Wolford heads-up with a pair of tens winning over a missed straight draw and pair of sixes.

=== Final table ===
Place	Name	Prize
1st	Jack Keller	$660,000
2nd	Byron Wolford	$264,000
3rd	Jesse Alto	$132,000
4th	David Chew	$66,000
5th	Rick Hamill	$66,000
6th	Curtis Skinner	$52,800
7th	Mike Allen	$26,400
8th	Howard Andrew	$26,400
9th	Rusty Lepage	$26,400
