= Sam Mastrogiannis =

Greek American poker player (born 1942)

- Born: March 2, 1942 (age 84)

World Series of Poker
- Bracelets: 3
- Money finishes: 3
- Highest WSOP Main Event finish: None

Stamatis A. "Sam" Mastrogiannis (born March 2, 1942) is a Greek American professional poker player who won two bracelets at the World Series of Poker.

== Poker career ==
Mastrogiannis has cashed three times at the World Series of Poker and won three bracelets. He won his first bracelet in 1979 in the $1,000 Razz event. He won his second bracelet in 1986 in the $1,500 Seven Card Stud event.

He won a Seven-card stud event at Amarillo Slim's Super Bowl of Poker for $39,000 in 1982.

Although Mastrogiannis is mostly a cash game player, his lifetime tournament winnings exceed $145,000.

== World Series of Poker Bracelets ==
Year	Tournament	Prize (US$)
1979	$1,000 Razz	$22,200
1986	$5,000 Seven Card Stud	$80,000
1986	$1,000 Seven Card Stud	$78,400

Sam Mastrogiannis invested his poker winnings and started his own shoe company. His shoe line was called the Mastroni. The shoes were sold at Nordstrom under the signature label.
