= 1984 Super Bowl of Poker =

Poker tournament

The Super Bowl of Poker (also known as Amarillo Slim's Super Bowl of Poker or SBOP) was the second most prestigious poker tournament in the world during the 1980s. While the World Series of Poker was already drawing larger crowds as more and more amateurs sought it out, the SBOP "was an affair limited almost exclusively to pros and hard-core amateurs."

Prior to 1979, the only high dollar tournament a person could enter was the WSOP. 1972 WSOP Main Event Champion and outspoken ambassador for poker Amarillo Slim saw this as an opportunity. "The World Series of Poker was so successful that everybody wanted more than one tournament," he said. Slim called upon his connections and friendships with poker's elite to start a new tournament in the February 1979. Before the SBOP had developed a reputation of its own, many of the most respected names in poker attended the tournament "more to support Slim and take advantage of the very fat cash games the event would obviously inspire." Slim modelled his SBOP after the WSOP with several events and a $10,000 Texas Hold'em Main Event.

One of the principal differences between the WSOP and the SBOP was the prize structure. The WSOP's prize structure was flat ensuring more people received smaller pieces of the prize pool. The SBOP typically used a 60-30-10 payout structure. In other words, only the first three places received money and generally in the ratio of 60% to first place, 30% to second place, and 10% to third. This payment schedule predominated the SBOP for the first 5 years of the event, but as the event grew the number of payouts increased while keeping the payout schedule top heavy.

== 1984 tournament ==
The 1984 tournament was the first year that a WSOP Main Event Champion won the SBOP Main Event. Stu Ungar who would be one of only two people to win 3 WSOP Main Events, won the first of his three SBOP Main Events in 1984. With his victory, he brought more respect and prestige to the event. Prior to this victory, poker's elite players went to the tournament more with the notion of playing in the associated cash games and to support their friend Amarillo Slim. Stu's victory made the title one that poker's elite sought.

Lyle Berman, who now serves as the Chairman of the Board of the World Poker Tour and is a member of the Poker Hall of Fame, won the $500 Pot Limit Omaha event.

== Key ==
*	Elected to the Poker Hall of Fame.
†	Denotes player who is deceased.
Place	The place in which people finish.
Name	The name of the player
Prize (US$)	Event prize money

=== Event 1: $ 10,000 No Limit Hold'em ===
- Number of buy-ins: Unknown
- Total prize pool: $525,000
- Number of payouts: 6

Final table
Place	Name	Prize
1st	Stu Ungar*	$275,000
2nd	Ralph Morton	$110,000
3rd	Richard Klamian	$55,000
4th	Chip Reese*	$27,500
5th	Ken Flaton	$27,500
6th	Austin Squatty	$27,500

=== Event 2: Ace-to-Five Lowball ===
- Number of buy-ins: Unknown
- Total prize pool: Unknown
- Number of payouts:

Final table
Place	Name	Prize
1st	Gabe Kaplan	Unknown

=== Event 3: $ 500 Ladies Limit Seven Card Stud ===
- Number of buy-ins: Unknown
- Total prize pool: Unknown
- Number of payouts: 6

Final table
Place	Name	Prize
1st	Barbara Lewis	$10,500

=== Event 4: $ 500 Pot Limit Omaha ===
- Number of buy-ins: Unknown
- Total prize pool: Unknown
- Number of payouts: 2

Final table
Place	Name	Prize
1st	Lyle Berman*	$97,750
2nd	Ralph Morton	$39,100

=== Event 5: $ 500 Limit Hold'em ===
- Number of buy-ins: Unknown
- Total prize pool: Unknown
- Number of payouts: Unknown

Final table
Place	Name	Prize
1st	Jim Craig	$43,000

=== Event 6: $ 5,000 Seven Card Stud - Championship Event ===
- Number of buy-ins: Unknown
- Total prize pool: Unknown
- Number of payouts: Unknown

Final table
Place	Name	Prize
1st	Mickey Appleman	Unknown
