= 1980 World Series of Poker =

Series of poker tournaments

- Location: Binion's Horseshoe, Las Vegas, Nevada
- Dates: May 6 – 17

Champion
- (United States) Stu Ungar

The 1980 World Series of Poker (WSOP) was a series of poker tournaments held at Binion's Horseshoe in May 1980.

== Events ==
There were 11 preliminary events at the 1980 World Series of Poker. The 1980 WSOP notably featured 11 players earning their first career bracelets in the first ten events. Lakewood Louie recorded his third consecutive World Series winning a bracelet.

#	Date	Event	Entries	Winner	Prize	Runner-up	
1	May 6, 1980	$500 Seven Card Stud	176	Bobby Schwing (1/1)	$52,800	Don Holt	Results
2	May 7, 1980	$1,000 No Limit Hold'em	138	Robert Bone (1/1)	$69,000	David Baxter	Results
3	May 8, 1980	$2,000 Draw High	13	Pat Callihan (1/1)	$15,600	Irv Warsaw	Results
4	May 9, 1980	$400 Ladies' Seven Card Stud	62	Deby Callihan (1/1)	$14,880	Linda Davis	Results
5	May 10, 1980	$5,000 Seven Card Stud	30	Pete Christ (1/1)	$90,000	Stu Ungar	Results
6	May 11, 1980	$10,000 Deuce to Seven Draw	19	Sarge Ferris (1/1)	$150,000	Doyle Brunson (0/6)	Results
7	May 12, 1980	$1,500 No Limit Hold'em	126	Gene Fisher (1/1)	$113,400	Louis Hunsucker (0/1)	Results
8	May 13, 1980	$1,000 Ace to Five Draw	61	Jim Fugatti (1/1)	$35,600	Johnny Hale	Results
9	May 14, 1980	$600 Mixed Doubles	41	A. J. Myers (1/1) & Lynn Harvey (1/1)	$7,380	Jackie McDaniel & Jim McDaniel	Results
10	May 15, 1980	$1,000 Seven Card Stud Split	51	Mickey Appleman (1/1)	$30,800	Bob Buckler	Results
11	May 16, 1980	$1,000 Seven Card Razz	56	Lakewood Louie (1/4)	$33,600	Joe Macchiaverna	Results
12	May 17, 1980	$10,000 No Limit Hold'em Main Event	73	Stu Ungar (1/1)	$365,000	Doyle Brunson (0/6)	Results

== Main Event ==
There were 73 entrants to the main event, with each paying an entry fee of $10,000. Stu Ungar defeated Doyle Brunson, who was seeking a record third Main Event win, heads-up. The 1980 Main Event was Ungar's first of three main event championship victories.

=== Final table ===
Place	Name	Prize
1st	Stu Ungar	$365,000
2nd	Doyle Brunson	$146,000
3rd	Jay Heimowitz	$109,500
4th	Johnny Moss	$73,000
5th	Charles Dunwoody	$36,500
6th	Gabe Kaplan	None
