= 1981 World Series of Poker =

Series of poker tournaments

- Location: Binion's Horseshoe, Las Vegas, Nevada
- Dates: May 7 – 24

Champion
- (United States) Stu Ungar

The 1981 World Series of Poker (WSOP) was a series of poker tournaments held at Binion's Horseshoe in May 1981.

== Events ==
There were 12 preliminary events at the 1981 WSOP. Johnny Moss became the first player in WSOP history to reach eight career bracelets. No other player would reach eight career bracelets until Doyle Brunson in the 1998 World Series of Poker.

#	Date	Event	Entries	Winner	Prize	Runner-up	Results
1	May 7, 1981	$1,000 Draw High	36	Ed Barmach (1/1)	$18,000	Jackie Mills	Results
2	May 8, 1981	$600 Mixed Doubles	52	Frank Cardone (1/1) & Juanda Matthews (1/1)	$7,800	Frank Geraci & Katie Ulanski	Results
3	May 9, 1981	$1,500 No Limit Hold'em	128	Fred David (1/1)	$96,000	Doug Johnson	Results
4	May 10, 1981	$1,000 Seven-card stud	104	Sid Gamerman (1/1)	$52,000	Mark Speert	Results
5	May 11, 1981	$400 Ladies' Seven-card stud	88	Ruth Godfrey (1/1)	$17,600	Jackie Jean	Results
6	May 12, 1981	$1,000 Razz	69	Bruce Hershenson (1/1)	$34,500	Bob Ross	Results
7	May 13, 1981	$1,000 Seven-card stud split	67	Johnny Moss (1/8)	$33,500	Ralph Bidwell	Results
8	May 14, 1981	$5,000 Seven-card stud	27	A. J. Myers (1/2)	$67,500	Eric Drache	Results
9	May 15, 1981	$2,500 Ace to Five Draw	37	Mickey Perry (1/1)	$46,250	Jack Straus (0/1)	Results
10	May 16, 1981	$1,000 No Limit Hold'em	162	Dody Roach (1/1)	$81,000	Unknown	Results
11	May 17, 1981	$1,000 Ace to Five Draw	88	Glen Rodgers (1/1)	$44,000	Rick Morella	Results
12	May 18, 1981	$10,000 Deuce to Seven Draw	19	Stu Ungar (1/2)	$95,000	Bobby Baldwin (0/4)	Results
13	May 19, 1981	$10,000 No Limit Hold'em Main Event	75	Stu Ungar (2/3)	$375,000	Perry Green (0/1)	Results

== Main Event ==
There were 75 entrants to the main event. Each paid $10,000 to enter the tournament. This main event was notable as the first one to have all final table players to receive a share of the prize pool, with the top 9 players finishing in the money. The 1981 Main Event was Stu Ungar's second consecutive World Championship.

=== Final table ===
Place	Name	Prize
1st	Stu Ungar	$375,000
2nd	Perry Green	$150,000
3rd	Gene Fisher	$75,000
4th	Ken Smith	$37,500
5th	Bill Smith	$37,500
6th	Jay Heimowitz	$30,000
7th	Bobby Baldwin	$15,000
8th	Sam Petrillo	$15,000
9th	Sam Moon	$15,000
