= Deby Callihan =

American poker player

World Series of Poker
- Bracelet: 1
- Money finish: 1
- Highest WSOP Main Event finish: None

Deby Callihan was a World Series of Poker champion in the 1980 $400 Ladies - Limit 7 Card Stud event.

Her total WSOP tournament winnings exceed $14,880.

== World Series of Poker bracelets ==
Year	Tournament	Prize (US$)
1980	$400 Ladies - Limit 7 Card Stud	$14,880
