= 1980 Super Bowl of Poker =

Poker tournament

The Super Bowl of Poker (also known as Amarillo Slim's Super Bowl of Poker or SBOP) was the second most prestigious poker tournament in the world during the 1980s. While the World Series of Poker was already drawing larger crowds as more and more amateurs sought it out, the SBOP "was an affair limited almost exclusively to pros and hard-core amateurs."

Prior to 1979, the only high dollar tournament a person could enter was the WSOP. 1972 WSOP Main Event Champion and outspoken ambassador for poker, Amarillo Slim saw this as an opportunity. "The World Series of Poker was so successful that everybody wanted more than one tournament," he said. Slim called upon his connections and friendships with poker's elite to start a new tournament in the February 1979. Slim modelled his SBOP after the WSOP with several events and a $10,000 Texas Hold'em Main Event.

One of the principal differences between the WSOP and the SBOP was the prize structure. The WSOP's prize structure was flat, ensuring more people received smaller pieces of the prize pool. The SBOP typically used a 60-30-10 payout structure. In other words, only the first three places received money and generally in the ratio of 60% to first place, 30% to second place, and 10% to third. This payment schedule predominated the SBOP for the first 5 years of the event, but as the event grew the number of payouts increased while keeping the payout schedule top heavy.

== 1980 Tournament ==
While very little is known about the 1980 Super Bowl of Poker, it was meaningful for two reasons.

First, Gabe Kaplan the star of the 1970s comedy Welcome Back, Kotter won the Main Event. Gabe's victory at this event sparked a wave of curiosity around the country. With his victory, people started to realize that anybody could play poker. Gabe went on to finish in sixth place at the 1980 World Series of Poker Main Event. These two victories propelled Gabe into the poker elite. Over the next several years Gabe had tremendous success at the SBOP. In 1982 he would finish in third place at the Main Event. In 1983 he would have a first and second-place finish in Lowball events. Then again in 1984 he would win another SBOP title in a Lowball tournament.

While Gabe's story caught the world's attention at the SBOP, another story went unnoticed. A young poker player named Stu Ungar made his first ever poker tournament appearance at the SBOP Main Event. When Stu was knocked out in 34th place (out of 41), nobody noticed. It was the only tournament he would play before entering the World Series of Poker a few months later. In May 1980, he won the WSOP Main Event becoming the youngest player in that tournament's short history.

== Key ==
*	Elected to the Poker Hall of Fame.
Place	The place in which people finish.
Name	The name of the player
Prize (US$)	Event prize money

=== Event 1: $10,000 No Limit Hold'em ===
- Number of buy-ins: Unknown
- Total prize pool: Unknown
- Number of payouts: Unknown

Final table
Place	Name	Prize
1st	Gabe Kaplan	$190,000
