= Gene Fisher =

American poker player

World Series of Poker
- Bracelets: 2
- Money finishes: 23
- Highest WSOP Main Event finish: 3rd, 1981

Gene Fisher is an American poker player from El Paso, Texas who won World Series of Poker bracelets in 1980 and 1993, winning the same amount ($113,400) in both events. He has also cashed in various other poker tournaments. Fisher stopped playing in the World Series of Poker for many years due to problems with the IRS.

He won his first WSOP bracelet in the $1,500 No Limit Hold'em event in 1980. Fisher came in third place the 1981 WSOP Main Event, which was eventually won by Stu Ungar after he defeated Perry Green in heads-up play.

Fisher won his second WSOP bracelet in 1993 by winning the $1,500 Seven-Card Stud Split event for $113,400, the same amount won for his first bracelet.

Fisher was also runner-up to Ungar in 1989 at Amarillo Slim's Super Bowl of Poker.

As of 2015, his total live tournament winnings exceed $1,200,000. His 23 cashes as the WSOP account for $581,246 of those winnings.

== WSOP Bracelets ==
Year	Tournament	Prize (US$)
1980	$1,500 No Limit Texas hold 'em	$113,400
1993	$1,500 Seven-Card Stud Split	$113,400
