= 1989 Super Bowl of Poker =

Prestigious 1980s poker tournament

The Super Bowl of Poker (also known as Amarillo Slim's Super Bowl of Poker or SBOP) was the second most prestigious poker tournament in the world during the 1980s. While the World Series of Poker was already drawing larger crowds as more and more amateurs sought it out, the SBOP "was an affair limited almost exclusively to pros and hard-core amateurs."

Prior to 1979, the only high dollar tournament a person could enter was the WSOP. 1972 WSOP Main Event Champion and outspoken ambassador for poker Amarillo Slim saw this as an opportunity. "The World Series of Poker was so successful that everybody wanted more than one tournament," he said. Slim called upon his connections and friendships with poker's elite to start a new tournament in the February 1979. Before the SBOP had developed a reputation of its own, many of the most respected names in poker attended the tournament "more to support Slim and take advantage of the very fat cash games the event would obviously inspire." Slim modelled his SBOP after the WSOP with several events and a $10,000 Texas Hold'em Main Event.

One of the principal differences between the WSOP and the SBOP was the prize structure. The WSOP's prize structure was flat ensuring more people received smaller pieces of the prize pool. The SBOP typically used a 60-30-10 payout structure. In other words, only the first three places received money and generally in the ratio of 60% to first place, 30% to second place, and 10% to third. This payment schedule predominated the SBOP for the first 5 years of the event, but as the event grew the number of payouts increased while keeping the payout schedule top heavy.

== 1989 Tournament ==
The 1989 SBOP was the third time wherein Poker Hall of Famer Stu Ungar won the Main Event. Ungar was the only person to win back-to-back tournaments and the only person to win the SBOP three times. Ungar was also the only person to win the WSOP Main Event three times. While Johnny Moss is a three-time WSOP Main Event winner, his first victory came as a result of a vote rather than the elimination tournament that it would assume the following year. Berry Johnston, another Hall of Famer, also won an event by claiming the title in the $200 Pot Limit Omaha with Rebuys tournament. Relatively little is preserved about the 1989 tournament. In most cases, the only thing that has been preserved was the name of the event winners, and in a few cases not even that much was recorded.

== Key ==
*	Elected to the Poker Hall of Fame.
Place	The place in which people finish.
Name	The name of the player
Prize (US$)	Event prize money

=== Event 1: $2,500 Lowball ===
- Number of buy-ins: Unknown
- Total prize pool: Unknown
- Number of payouts: Unknown

Final table
Place	Name	Prize
1st	Bob Stupak	$47,500

=== Event 2: $400 Ladies Seven Card Stud ===
- Number of buy-ins: Unknown
- Total prize pool: Unknown
- Number of payouts: Unknown

=== Event 3: $500 Limit Hold'em ===
- Number of buy-ins: Unknown
- Total prize pool: Unknown
- Number of payouts: Unknown

=== Event 4: $1,000 Lowball ===
- Number of buy-ins: Unknown
- Total prize pool: Unknown
- Number of payouts: Unknown

=== Event 5: $500 Seven Card Razz ===
- Number of buy-ins: Unknown
- Total prize pool: Unknown
- Number of payouts: Unknown

Final table
Place	Name	Prize
1st	David Bradley	$30,000

=== Event 6: $500 Limit 7 Card Stud ===
- Number of buy-ins: Unknown
- Total prize pool: Unknown
- Number of payouts: Unknown

Final table
Place	Name	Prize
1st	Buddy McIntosh	$45,000

=== Event 8: $200 Pot Limit Omaha with Rebuys ===
- Number of buy-ins: 183
- Total prize pool: $208,100
- Number of payouts: 9

Final table
Place	Name	Prize
1st	Austin Squatty*	$99,050

=== Event 9: $1,000 7 Card Stud Hi/Lo ===
- Number of buy-ins: Unknown
- Total prize pool: Unknown
- Number of payouts: Unknown

Final table
Place	Name	Prize
1st	Ken Henderson	$50,500

=== Event 11: $1,000 Limit Hold'em ===
- Number of buy-ins: Unknown
- Total prize pool: Unknown
- Number of payouts: Unknown

Final table
Place	Name	Prize
1st	Glenn Cozen	$542,500

=== Event 12: $200 Pot Limit Omaha with Rebuys ===
- Number of buy-ins: Unknown
- Total prize pool: Unknown
- Number of payouts: Unknown

Final table
Place	Name	Prize
1st	Ken Smith	$84,000

=== Event 13: $1,500 Limit 7 Card Stud ===
- Number of buy-ins: Unknown
- Total prize pool: Unknown
- Number of payouts: Unknown

Final table
Place	Name	Prize
1st	John Spadavecchia	$72,000
1st	Gene Fisher	$28,800

=== Event 14: $1,500 No Limit Hold'em ===
- Number of buy-ins: Unknown
- Total prize pool: Unknown
- Number of payouts: Unknown

Final table
Place	Name	Prize
1st	Derek Farrington	$99,500

=== Event 15: Limit 7 Card Stud ===
- Number of buy-ins: Unknown
- Total prize pool: Unknown
- Number of payouts: Unknown

Final table
Place	Name	Prize
1st	Len Miller	$1,200

=== Event 16: $10,000 No Limit Hold'em - Super Bowl of Poker ===
- Number of buy-ins: Unknown
- Total prize pool: Unknown
- Number of payouts: Unknown

Final table
Place	Name	Prize
1st	Stu Ungar*	$205,000
2nd	Len Miller	$102,500
