= John Cernuto =

American poker player (1944–2025)

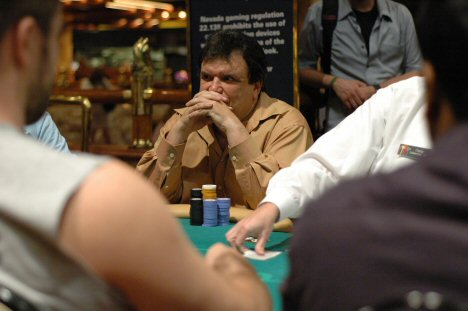
- Cernuto playing in 2005
- Nickname: Miami John
- Born: January 11, 1944; Jersey City, New Jersey, U.S.
- Died: February 10, 2025 (aged 81)

World Series of Poker
- Bracelets: 3
- Money finishes: 65
- Highest WSOP Main Event finish: 345th, 2011

World Poker Tour
- Title: None
- Final tables: 3
- Money finishes: 9

European Poker Tour
- Title: None
- Final table: 1
- Money finishes: 3

John Anthony Cernuto (January 11, 1944 – February 10, 2025) also known as Miami, was an American professional poker player based in Las Vegas, Nevada, specialising in Omaha hi-lo events. Cernuto won over $6,200,000 in live tournament winnings. His largest score was for $259,150 from his $2,000 No Limit Hold'em bracelet victory in the 1997 World Series of Poker.

== Background ==
Cernuto was born on January 11, 1944. Before embarking on his poker career, Cernuto worked as an air traffic controller. When President Ronald Reagan fired the air traffic controllers during a 1981 strike, he turned to poker for his profession.

Cernuto died from colon cancer on February 10, 2025, at the age of 81.

== Poker career ==
=== World Series of Poker ===
Cernuto first cashed in the World Series of Poker (WSOP) after making the final table in the 1989 World Series of Poker in the $5,000 Seven-card stud event. He finished fourth in the final table, which featured David Sklansky, Humberto Brenes, Gabe Kaplan, and the tournament winner Don Holt.

Five WSOP cashes followed before Cernuto won his first bracelet in the 1996 WSOP $1,500 seven card stud split tournament. He won the $2,000 no limit hold'em event in the 1997 World Series of Poker and the $1,500 limit Omaha event in the 2002 World Series of Poker.

Cernuto made an impressive three final tables in the 2006 World Series of Poker, two in Seven Card Stud and one in Razz.

During the $2,500 Razz tournament of the 2009 WSOP, Cernuto collapsed and was taken to a hospital, where he spent the night after being diagnosed with internal bleeding.

At the 2011 World Series of Poker Main Event, Cernuto finished in 345th place for his best career placement in the World Championship.

As of the 2023 World Series of Poker, Cernuto finished in the money in at least one World Series of Poker tournament per year starting in 1992.

=== World Series of Poker bracelets ===
Year	Tournament	Prize (US$)
1996	$1,500 Seven Card Stud Split	$147,000
1997	$2,000 No Limit Hold'em	$259,150
2002	$1,500 Limit Omaha	$73,320

=== Other poker achievements ===
In 1988, Cernuto won the $1,000 Seven Card Stud event at Amarillo Slim's Super Bowl of Poker tournament series, earning a cash prize of $58,000 in addition to the title. The victory at the SBOP was Cernuto's first career victory in a major poker tournament.

In 2003, he won the third World Heads-Up Poker Championship in Vienna, outlasting a field including fellow professionals Ivo Donev, Ram Vaswani, Dave Colclough, Scotty Nguyen, and Padraig Parkinson on the way to the €60,000 grand prize.

Cernuto also made one World Poker Tour (WPT) final table at the 2005 PokerStars Caribbean Poker Adventure event won by John Gale.

=== Poker Winnings / Accolades ===
As of 2023, his total live tournament winnings exceed $6,200,000.

In 2019, actor James Woods, a close friend of Cernuto's dubbed him the “Ironman of Poker”, as Cernuto is the all-time leader in poker tournament cashes.

At the 2020 Global Poker Awards, Cernuto was given the distinguished "Hendon Mob" award for his lifetime tournament cashes record.

== Blackjack ==
Cernuto made appearances on the Ultimate Blackjack Tour, making a final table in the Elimination Blackjack event where he played in a tournament format of the game of blackjack.
