= Alma McClelland =

American poker player

World Series of Poker
- Bracelet: 1
- Money finishes: 6
- Highest WSOP Main Event finish: None

Alma McClelland (October 1, 1921 – July 18, 2000) was a World Series of Poker (WSOP) champion in the 1989 $500 Ladies - Limit 7 Card Stud event.

Her total WSOP tournament winnings exceed $63,960. Her last live tournament cash came in 1993.

She is the late wife of former WSOP tournament director Jack McClelland.

== World Series of Poker bracelet ==
Year	Tournament	Prize (US$)
1989	$500 Ladies - Limit 7 Card Stud	$18,600
