= Barbara Enright =

American poker player

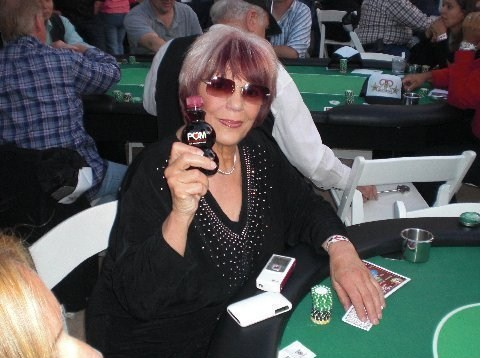
- Enright in 2009. during Monte Carlo Night, an annual charity poker tournament held at the Northridge, California, estate of Nancy Cartwright.

World Series of Poker
- Bracelets: 3
- Final tables: 4
- Money finishes: 36
- Highest WSOP Main Event finish: 5th, 1995

Barbara Enright is an American professional poker player, motivational speaker, and editor-in-chief of Woman Poker Player magazine, and an Ambassador of Poker League of Nations, the world's largest women's poker organization. She has won three bracelets at the World Series of Poker and made it to the US$10,000 No-Limit Hold'em 1995 Main Event final table.

Enright was the first woman to win an open event at the World Series of Poker (WSOP), the first woman to win three WSOP bracelets, and was the first female player to make the final table of the $10,000 buy-in main event.

== Early life ==
Enright began playing poker at home at the age of 4, playing five card draw against her older brother. She started playing in cardrooms in 1976. Enright worked as a hairstylist, bartender, and cocktail waitress, often holding down three jobs at once to support her family. Soon she was making more money playing poker part-time than all of her jobs combined so she quit working and started playing poker for a living full-time.

== Poker career ==
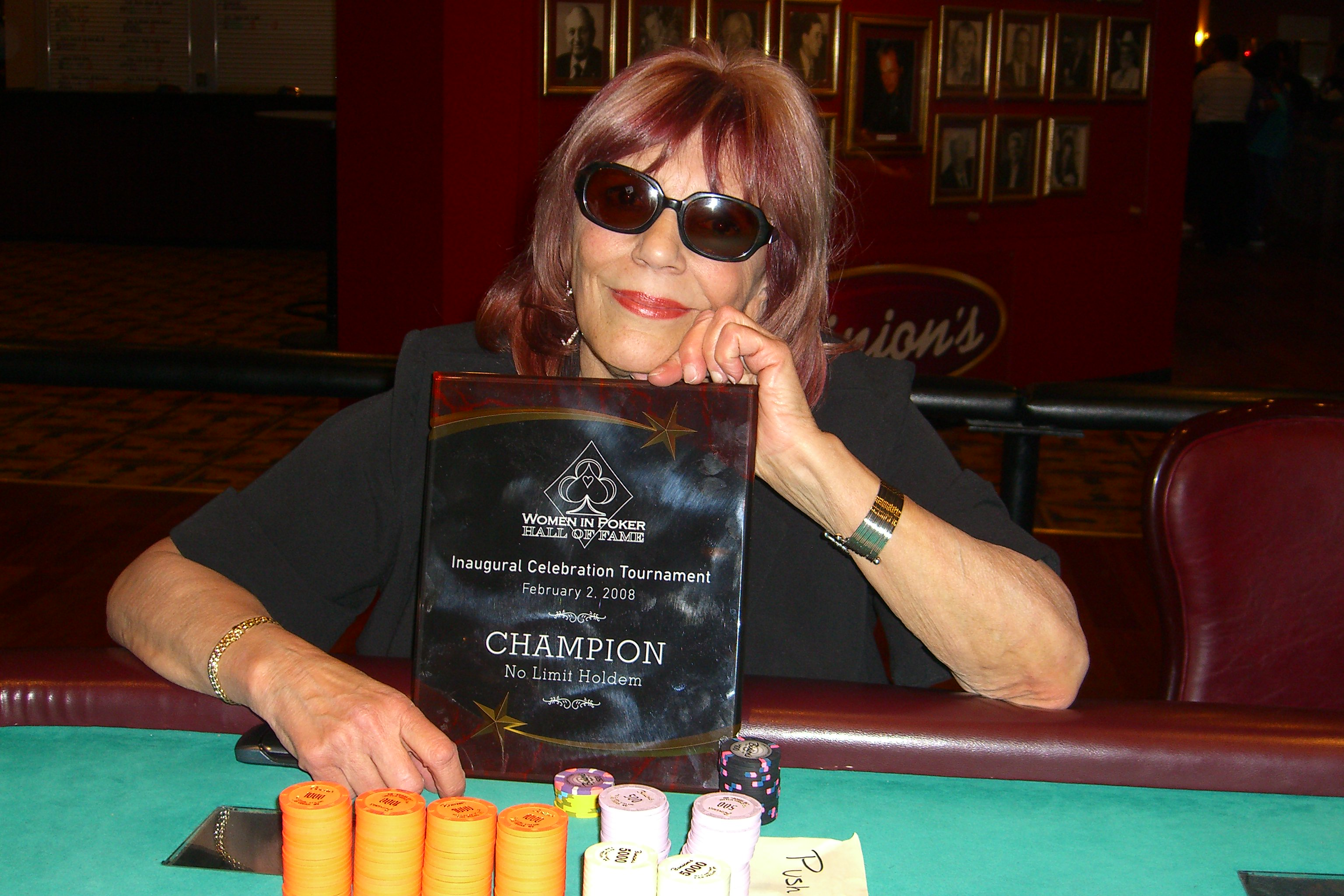
Enright on the night of her induction into the Women in Poker Hall of Fame

Enright won her first WSOP bracelet in a $500 Women's 7-Card Stud event in 1986. Enright is best known as the first woman to have reached the final table of the World Series of Poker (WSOP) US$10,000 no limit hold'em Main Event. She achieved this in 1995, finishing in 5th place after her pocket eights were outdrawn by a suited 6–3. She also finished in the money in the 2005 Main Event, having qualified through a $10 online satellite tournament. Enright was the first woman to win two WSOP bracelets, the first woman to win three bracelets and the first woman to win an open event at the World Series of Poker.

On July 6, 2007, Barbara Enright was inducted into the Poker Hall of Fame along with Phil Hellmuth. She was the first woman to be inducted, followed only by Linda Johnson in 2011 and Jennifer Harman in 2015. In 2008, Enright was inducted into the Women in Poker Hall of Fame, making her the only poker player to be in all three poker halls of fame including the Senior Poker Hall of Fame, the World Series of Poker Hall of Fame and the Women in Poker Hall of Fame.

Enright received the All Around Best Player Award at the 2000 Legends of Poker tournament and was awarded along with her prize money, a new PT Cruiser for her trophy. She had eight money finishes and six final tables.

She was the highest finisher among women in the Tournament of Champions of Poker held at the Orleans Hotel and Casino in Las Vegas. She finished in 11th place and just missed winning a car by one player.

She also took part in the televised poker series Poker Royale: Battle of the Ages.

As of 2018, Enright's total live tournament winnings exceed $1,650,000. Her 21 cashes at the WSOP account for over $425,000 of those winnings.

Enright is in a relationship with poker player and author Max Shapiro.

=== World Series Of Poker Bracelets ===
Year	Tournament	Prize
1986	Women's Seven-Card Stud	$16,400
1994	Women's Seven-Card Stud	$38,400
1996 *	Pot Limit Hold'em	$180,000

* First woman to win a bracelet in an open event
