= Robert Turner (poker player) =

American poker player

- Nickname: Chip Burner

World Series of Poker
- Bracelet: 1
- Money finishes: 28
- Highest WSOP Main Event finish: 6th, 1994

World Poker Tour
- Title: None
- Final table: None
- Money finish: 1

Robert Turner is an American professional poker player based in Downey, California.

Turner is known for introducing Omaha hold 'em into poker-playing circles. He introduced the game to Bill Boyd, who offered it as a game at the Golden Nugget Casino (calling it "Nugget Hold'em".)

Robert Turner created Live At The Bike and Legends of Poker, for the Bicycle Casino. Turner also created The Grand Slam of Poker at Hustler Casino and The National Championship Of Poker for Hollywood Park Casino. In 1999 Turner created World Team Poker. Turner began playing in the 1970s and has won a Best All-Around Player Award at least once per decade since. Turner won the 1986 Grand Prix of Poker.

Turner won a World Series of Poker (WSOP) bracelet in 1993 in the $1,500 seven-card stud event. He has finished in the money of the $10,000 no limit hold'em main event on numerous occasions: 10th in 1991, 36th in 1992, 13th in 1993, 6th in 1994, and 97th in 2005.

Turner has worked as an executive host at several of the largest poker casinos, most recently at the Bicycle Casino and Crystal Park Casino in the Los Angeles area.

As of 2008, his total live tournament winnings exceed $2,100,000. His 28 cashes at the WSOP account for $568,357 of those winnings.
