= Bill Smith (poker player) =

American poker player (1934–1996)

- Born: March 14, 1934; Roswell, New Mexico, U.S.
- Died: February 28, 1996 (aged 61); Nevada, U.S.

World Series of Poker
- Bracelet: 1
- Money finishes: 3
- Highest WSOP Main Event finish: Winner, 1985

Bill Smith (March 14, 1934 – February 28, 1996) was a professional poker player who won the 1985 World Series of Poker Main Event.

== Poker career ==
Smith was a staple at the World Series of Poker (WSOP) during the 1980s. He was involved in three final tables of the Main Event. At the 1981 and 1986 WSOP, Smith placed fifth, but at the 1985 World Series of Poker he won the bracelet and $700,000. His total tournament winnings exceeded $1,050,000. His three cashes at the WSOP accounted for $788,800 of his lifetime winnings.

Smith often played professional poker tournaments drunk. By all accounts, he was an alcoholic.

According to fellow poker player T. J. Cloutier, Smith did not play well when he was sober or totally drunk. “Bill was the tightest player you'd ever played in your life when he was sober. And when he was halfway drunk, he was the best player I'd ever played with. No one could read opponents’ hands better than half- drunk Smith. But when he got past that halfway mark, he was the worst player I'd ever played with.”

The year Smith won the Main Event, he entered the final day's play sober. After he started drinking, he gathered a large number of chips through aggressive play. According to T.J. Cloutier, Smith remained successful despite becoming heavily intoxicated, and good luck contributed to his win.

Smith died on February 8, 1996.

=== World Series of Poker Bracelets ===
Year	Tournament	Prize (US$)
1985	$10,000 No Limit Hold'em World Championship	$700,000
