= David Baxter (poker player) =

American poker player

World Series of Poker
- Bracelets: 2
- Money finishes: 14
- Highest WSOP Main Event finish: 15th, 1986

David Baxter was an American poker player from Corpus Christi, Texas, who won two bracelets at the World Series of Poker (WSOP).

== Poker ==
Baxter first cashed in the WSOP in 1980 in a no limit hold'em event. He won his first bracelet in 1983 in the $1,500 no limit hold'em event, winning $145,500. He won his second bracelet in 1986 in the $2,500 pot limit omaha event, taking home $127,000 for the win.

Baxter also cashed in the $10,000 Main Event three times: 15th place in 1986, 18th place in 1991, and 22nd place in 1995. During his career, Baxter cashed 14 times and had total earnings of $432,197 at the World Series of Poker.

He also had numerous cashes and wins in various other tournaments, including the William Hill Poker Grand Prix and Amarillo Slim's Super Bowl of Poker, and several other prominent tournaments in the United States.

Baxter won the Grand Prix of Poker $10,000 No Limit Hold'em event in 1984, taking the title and prize of $320,000. In defence of his title, he finished as runner-up in the same tournament the following year. He also won the America's Cup of Poker $1,000 Ace to Five event and the $5,000 Deuce to Seven Draw event at the Grand Prix of Poker, both in 1987. Baxter also made seven final tables at various tournaments at the Super Bowl of Poker throughout the 1980s. He retired from playing in poker tournaments sometime in the late 1990s. His total tournament winnings during his career exceed $1,400,000.

=== World Series of Poker bracelets ===
Year	Tournament	Prize (US$)
1983	$1,500 No Limit Hold'em	$145,500
1986	$2,500 Pot Limit Omaha w/Rebuys	$127,000
