= Stu Ungar =

American poker player (1953–1998)

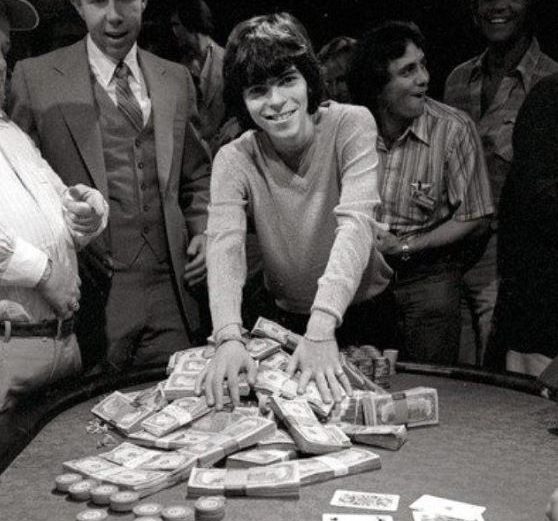
- Ungar at the 1981 World Series of Poker
- Nicknames: Stuey; The Kid; The Comeback Kid
- Born: Stuart Errol Ungar; September 8, 1953; Manhattan, New York, U.S.
- Died: November 22, 1998 (aged 45); Las Vegas, Nevada, U.S.

World Series of Poker
- Bracelets: 5
- Money finishes: 16
- Highest WSOP Main Event finish: Winner, 1980, 1981, 1997

Stuart Errol Ungar (September 8, 1953 – November 22, 1998) was an American professional poker, blackjack, and gin rummy player, widely regarded to have been the greatest gin player of all time and one of the best Texas hold 'em players.

Ungar is one of two people in poker history to have won the World Series of Poker Main Event three times. He is the only person to win Amarillo Slim's Super Bowl of Poker three times, the world's second most prestigious poker title of its time. Additionally, Ungar is one of only four players in poker history to win consecutive titles in the WSOP Main Event, along with Johnny Moss, Doyle Brunson and Johnny Chan.

== Early life ==
Ungar was born to Jewish parents Isidore (1907–1967) and Faye Ungar (1916–1979). He was raised on Manhattan's Lower East Side. His father, Isidore ("Ido") Ungar, was a bookmaker and loan shark who ran a bar/social club called Foxes Corner that doubled as a gambling establishment, exposing Stu to gambling at a young age. Despite Ido's attempts to keep his son from gambling after seeing its effects on his regular customers, Stu began playing underground gin rummy and quickly made a name for himself. Ungar was gifted at school and skipped seventh grade, but then dropped out of school in tenth grade.

Ido died of a heart attack on July 25, 1967. Following his father's death, and with his mother virtually incapacitated by a stroke, Ungar drifted around the New York gambling scene until age 18, when he was befriended by reputed organized crime figure Victor Romano. Romano was regarded as one of the best card players of his time. He had the ability to recite the spelling and definition of all of the words in the dictionary and apparently shared a penchant and interest for calculating odds while gambling as Ungar did. By many accounts, the two developed a very close relationship, with Romano serving as a mentor and protector.

Ungar was infamous for his arrogance and for routinely criticizing aloud the play of opponents he felt were beneath him, which included just about anyone. One of Ungar's most famous quotes sums up his competitiveness: "I never want to be called a 'good loser.' Show me a good loser and I'll just show you a loser." However, his relationship with Romano gave Ungar protection from various gamblers who did not take kindly to his crass attitude and assassin-like playing style.

=== Gin rummy and transition to poker ===
Ungar won a local gin tournament at age 10. He dropped out of school to play gin rummy in the 1960s full-time to help support his mother and sister after his father died, and began regularly winning tournaments which earned him $10,000 or more. By 1976, he was regarded as one of the best players in New York City.

Ungar eventually had to leave New York due to gambling debts at local race tracks. He later moved to Miami, Florida, to find more action. In 1977, Ungar left Miami for Las Vegas, Nevada, where he reunited with Madeline Wheeler, a former girlfriend who would become his wife in 1982.

One of the reasons Ungar eventually took up poker exclusively was because gin action had dried up due to his skilled reputation. Ungar destroyed anyone who challenged him in a gin match, including a professional widely regarded as the best gin player of Ungar's generation, Harry "Yonkie" Stein. Ungar beat Stein 86 games to none in a high-stakes game of Hollywood Gin, after which Stein dropped out of sight in gin circles and eventually stopped playing professionally. As one observer who knew him put it, Stein "was never the same after that night." After beating Stein and several other top gin professionals, Ungar was a marked man. Nobody wanted to play him in gin. In the hopes of generating more action for himself, Ungar began offering potential opponents handicaps to even the playing field. He was known to let his opponent (professional or not) look at the last card in the deck, offer rebates to defeated opponents and always play each hand in the dealer position, all of which put him at a strong disadvantage.

When Ungar first visited Las Vegas in 1977, gin was still popular in a tournament format, much like heads up poker tournaments. Ungar won or finished highly in so many gin tournaments that several casinos asked him to not play in them because many players said they would not enter if they knew Ungar was playing. Ungar later said in his biography that he loved seeing his opponent slowly break down over the course of a match, realizing he could not win and eventually get a look of desperation on his face.

Shortly after arriving in Las Vegas, Ungar defeated professional gambler Billy Baxter for $40,000. Baxter noted that when Ungar first entered the room, Baxter did not believe he was his opponent because of Ungar's youthful looks and small stature. Baxter also said that during their match, a Coca-Cola crate had to be placed on Ungar's chair so he could reach the table.

Though he is nowadays more well known for his poker accomplishments, Ungar regarded himself as a better gin rummy player, once stating,

Some day, I suppose it's possible for someone to be a better no limit hold 'em player than me. I doubt it, but it could happen. But, I swear to you, I don't see how anyone could ever play gin better than me.

== 1980 and 1981 WSOP Main Event titles ==
In 1980, Ungar entered the World Series of Poker (WSOP) looking for more high-stakes action. In an interview for the 1997 Main Event Final Table, Ungar told ESPN TV commentator Gabe Kaplan that the 1980 WSOP was the first time he had ever played a Texas hold'em tournament. Poker legend Doyle Brunson remarked that it was the first time he had seen a player improve as the tournament went on.

Ungar won the main event, defeating Brunson, who wrote the book on Texas Hold ‘Em, by reading the book the night before he entered, becoming the youngest champion in its history (surpassed first by Phil Hellmuth in 1989, then others). Ungar looked even younger than he was, and was dubbed "The Kid."

Ungar would defend his title successfully at the 1981 WSOP by defeating Perry Green. Ungar was nearly not allowed to defend his title. Several days before the main event, he was banned from Binion's Horseshoe by Benny Binion because he spat in the face of a dealer after losing a sizable pot in a high-stakes game. Binion's son Jack interceded and convinced his father to let Ungar play, citing the media attention that the defending champion would attract.

=== Other WSOP bracelets ===
As the reigning world champion, Ungar won his second bracelet in 1981 in the $10,000 Deuce to Seven Draw event, defeating 1978 world champion Bobby Baldwin in heads-up play. For this victory, Ungar received $95,000.

In the 1983 World Series of Poker, Ungar won his fourth bracelet. He defeated professional poker player and multi-WSOP bracelet winner Dewey Tomko in the $5,000 Seven Card Stud event, winning $110,000.

== Blackjack ==
Ungar's prodigy-level IQ and total recall contributed to his blackjack card counting abilities, which were so sharp that he was frequently banned from playing in casinos; he was eventually unable to play blackjack in Las Vegas or anywhere else.

In 1977, Ungar was bet $100,000 by Bob Stupak, an owner and designer of casinos, that he could not count down half a six-deck shoe and determine the last three decks (156 cards). Ungar won the bet.

Ungar was fined in 1982 by the New Jersey Gaming Commission for allegedly cheating while playing blackjack in an Atlantic City casino. The casino said that Ungar "capped" a bet (put extra chips on a winning hand after it was over to be paid out more), something he vehemently denied. The fine for this offense was $500; however, paying it would have also forced Ungar to admit that he had cheated. Ungar believed that his memory and card counting ability were natural skills and thus he did not need to cap bets or partake in any form of cheating. Ungar fought the case in court and won, avoiding the $500 fine. The court battle, though, cost him an estimated $50,000 in legal and travel expenses. In his biography, Ungar claimed he was consequently so exhausted from travel and court proceedings that he was not able to successfully defend his WSOP main event title.

In 1997, a nearly-broke Ungar convinced the management at the Lady Luck Hotel & Casino to let him play single-deck blackjack. Since Ungar was a known card counter, the casino managers agreed on the condition that his betting would have a high and a low limit (a limited spread), which they presumed would render useless Ungar's card counting ability. However, in the game of single-deck blackjack, playing strategy (i.e. how to play a hand and deviate from basic strategy) brings more benefits to the player than betting strategy (i.e. how much to bet on the upcoming round). Ungar continued to play blackjack at the Lady Luck for six months. He built his bankroll up to as much as $300,000 but eventually busted out.

== Drug addiction and divorce ==
Ungar's mother had died in 1979. It was also around this time that Ungar began using cocaine. He noted in his autobiography that at first he used it on the advice of fellow poker players because of the drug's ability to keep someone up and energized for a long period of time, something that would come in handy during marathon poker sessions. However, recreational use soon led to addiction.

Ungar and Madeline were married in 1982 and had a daughter, Stefanie, that same year. Ungar also legally adopted Madeline's son from her first marriage, Richie, who adored Ungar and took his surname.

Ungar and Madeline divorced in 1986. Richie died by suicide in 1989, shortly after his high school prom.

Ungar's drug problem escalated to such a point that during the WSOP Main Event in 1990, Ungar was found on the third day of the tournament unconscious on the floor of his hotel room from a drug overdose. However, he had such a chip lead that even when the dealers kept taking his blinds out every orbit, Ungar still made the final table and finished ninth without playing another hand, pocketing $25,050.

His addiction took such a physical toll that in an ESPN piece, many of Ungar's friends and fellow competitors said that they thought that he would not live to see his fortieth birthday. In the same piece, one friend said that the only thing that kept him alive was his determination to see his daughter grow up.

Most of Ungar's winnings at the poker table he lost quickly betting on sports or horses, always looking for "action".

Many of Ungar's friends, including Mike Sexton, began to encourage him to enter drug rehab and offered to pay for Ungar to receive treatment at any facility in the world. Ungar refused, citing several people he knew who had been to rehab previously who told him that drugs were easier to obtain in rehab than on the street.

== Later life ==
=== "The Comeback Kid" ===
In 1997, Ungar was deeply in debt and clearly showed physical damage from his years of addiction. However, he would receive the $10,000 buy-in to the WSOP Main Event from fellow poker pro and friend Billy Baxter moments before the tournament started and was the last person added to the roster, mere seconds before the signup closed.

Ungar was exhausted on the tournament's first day as he had been up for over 24 hours straight trying to raise or borrow enough money to play in the event. At one point midway through the first day of play, Ungar began to fall asleep at his table and told Mike Sexton (who was also playing) he didn't think he could make it. After encouragement from Sexton and a tongue lashing from Baxter, Ungar settled in and made it through the day.

During the tournament, Ungar kept a picture of his daughter Stefanie in his wallet, and he regularly called her with updates on his progress. Following an up-and-down first day, Ungar showed up for each subsequent day well rested and mentally sharp. He would go on to amass a large chip lead and carry the lead into the final table. Ungar was so highly regarded at this point that local bookies made him the favorite to win the tournament over the entire field, an extreme rarity.

Ungar went on to win the Main Event, joining Johnny Moss as the only three-time winners. After his victory, which was taped for broadcast by ESPN, Ungar was interviewed by Gabe Kaplan, and he showed the picture of his daughter to the camera and dedicated his win to her. He and Baxter split the $1 million first prize. Ungar was dubbed "The Comeback Kid" by the Las Vegas media because of the 16-year span between his main event wins as well as his past drug abuse.

During the 1997 WSOP, Ungar wore a pair of round, cobalt blue-tinted sunglasses to, according to co-biographer Peter Alson, "hide the fact that his nostrils had collapsed from cocaine abuse."

=== Final years ===
Ungar spent all of his 1997 WSOP prize money over the course of the next few months, mainly on drugs and sports betting. He attempted to give up drugs several times at the behest of Stefanie but stayed clean for only weeks at a time before relapsing.

As the April 1998 WSOP approached, Baxter again offered to pay his entry fee to the main event. However, ten minutes before play started, Ungar told Baxter he was tired and did not feel like playing. Ungar later said the real reason he chose not to play in the event was due to his drug abuse in the weeks prior to the tournament. He noted that he felt showing up in his current condition would be more embarrassing than not showing up at all.

In November 1998, Ungar was ready to return to play. His friend Bob Stupak made an arrangement to stake Ungar over a period of time as a fresh start for Ungar. Baxter noted in Ungar's biography that he also backed him in a high stakes game at the Bellagio around this time.

=== Death ===
On November 20, 1998, Ungar checked into room No. 6 at the Oasis Motel, a budget motel located at the end of the Las Vegas Strip. Ungar paid just $48 per night for two nights. On November 22, he was found in the room dead, lying on the floor, fully clothed and with the television off. Doyle Brunson was quoted as saying "Everybody felt terrible, but it wasn't a surprise."

Among his possessions was $800 of a $25,000 advance from Bob Stupak, with whom Ungar had signed a contract earlier in the month to pay off debts and finance his tournament play in exchange for future winnings. No drugs were found in the room. It’s unknown where the remainder of the money went.

An autopsy showed traces of drugs in Ungar's system, but not enough to have directly caused his death. The medical examiner concluded that his death was the result of a heart condition brought on by years of drug abuse.

Despite having won an estimated $30 million during his poker career, Ungar died with no assets to his name. Stupak took up a collection at Ungar's funeral to raise funds to pay for the services.

Ungar is interred at Palm Valley View Memorial Park in East Las Vegas.

== Gameplay ==
Ungar was noted for his ultra-aggressive playing style and well-timed bluffs. Mike Sexton said that Ungar's chips were constantly in motion, and he was described by a fellow professional poker player during the 1997 World Series of Poker as having a "clairvoyant" ability to see his opponents' hole cards.

Several of Ungar's financial backers have commented that he could have earned an immeasurable amount more over his career had he been more of a "hustler", giving his opponents the false belief they could beat him and thus be willing to risk more money trying. However, Ungar wanted to beat his opponents as soundly as possible, and he often insulted those whose skills he felt were inferior to his own. In his biography, Ungar also noted several opponents who offered to pay him to lose a gin match on purpose in order to collect a large side bet. The opponent would have someone else place the bet, and upon winning they would split the large payoff with Ungar. However, Ungar indicated that pride in his own skill would not allow him to do this; apparently he could not stand the idea of someone having a victory against him, even an illegitimate one.

During the 1992 World Series of Poker, Ungar faced off against 1990 World Champion Mansour Matloubi in a series of $50,000 buy-in no limit hold'em heads-up freezeout events. On the final hand of the game, Matloubi tried to bluff Ungar all-in for $32,000 on the river with a board of 3-3-7-K-Q. Ungar, who held 10–9, thought for a few seconds and said to Matloubi, "You have 4-5 or 5-6 so I'm gonna call you with this" and flipped over his 10-high to win the pot and bust Matloubi, who in fact held 4-5 offsuit.

== Personality ==
Ungar was once at an airport attempting to fly out of the United States to Europe for a poker tournament with several fellow pros. All of his friends had passports, but he did not. He did not even have a Social Security number until after his 1980 WSOP win and that was only because he was forced to obtain one in order to collect his winnings. Upon telling the airport customs agent he needed the passport immediately to leave the country, the agent replied that for a small fee, they could push the necessary forms through quicker for him. Ungar misconstrued this as a request for a bribe, something he was used to back in New York when with Romano. He had no problem doing this and slipped the agent a $100 bill. However the agent was actually referring to a small "expedite fee" that was common for all passport applicants. The agent was going to call the police and have Ungar arrested for attempting to bribe a public official before his fellow poker players stepped in and smoothed things over.

At one point Ungar was being staked by Las Vegas mob enforcer Anthony "The Ant" Spilotro, and showed up at Spilotro's house after having been gone for two days (he was supposed to check in to report his take every day) with a gun in his waistband. Through a slit in the doorway, Spilotro's son Vincent witnessed his father beat Ungar brutally, not for losing money or not having reported, but for the disrespect of bringing a gun into his home. His relationship with Spilotro was one that helped define Las Vegas of the 1980s.

Despite owning several expensive cars, Ungar rarely drove. This could have possibly come from the time he purchased a brand new Mercedes sports car and drove it until the vehicle ran out of oil and broke down. He brought it back to the dealership and was told by a mechanic that it had no oil and thus would not run. Ungar replied, "Why the hell didn't you tell me you had to put oil in the car?" He preferred to take a taxicab virtually anywhere he went, even from his home in Las Vegas to the casinos, which were only a short distance away. Ungar was known to be a large tipper to cabbies and casino employees, regardless of whether he was winning. Mike Sexton once noted that "Stuey spent what most people make in a year on cab fares."

Ungar's friends often said he "ate like a wild animal." Ungar saw eating as something that had to be gotten over with so he could get back to gambling action. He would often call restaurants ahead of time and place an order for himself and everyone in his party so it was ready at the same time his table was when they got there. Sexton noted that because Ungar would pay for everyone in his dining party, regardless of how expensive the meal was, it was impossible to argue with his method. He would race in to the restaurant, shovel the food down as fast as he could, throw cash for the entire meal plus a generous tip on the table and be ready to leave, even if the rest of his party had just barely started on drinks or appetizers.

The same friends also noted that Ungar, when he had money, was one of the most generous people they had ever met. He was known to always be willing to help out a friend. When he was on a hot winning streak, he sent his longtime sports betting friend Michael "Baseball Mike" Salem enough money to pay for several months of his mortgage. Salem had not asked for money and had only mentioned offhand to Ungar he was in the midst of a nasty losing streak. Ungar's own attorney recalled a time when Ungar asked him how he was doing. He responded that he was OK, but struggling a little financially. Ungar immediately took $10,000 cash out of his pocket and gave it to him, saying "Take it. It's yours. Pay me back when you can. And if you don't pay me back, that's OK too." One time, he was walking through Las Vegas with Doyle Brunson. A man stopped him and asked for some money. Ungar pulled out a $100 bill and gave it to the man. When Brunson asked him who the man was, Ungar replied, "If I had known his name, I would have given him $200."

Sexton and Ungar became friends when Sexton was suffering a losing streak and was nearly broke. Ungar was playing in a high limit seven card stud game and had to use the restroom. He told Sexton to "pick up a hand" (play the next hand) for him. This is generally not allowed in card rooms today, but for top pros like Ungar, rules were much more laxly enforced back then. Although Sexton made a straight on the first five cards he was dealt, he played cautiously at first, not wanting to be overly aggressive with another man's money. Ungar returned from the restroom in the middle of the hand, at which point he was (to Sexton's surprise) thrilled that his money was involved in such a giant pot. His attitude made Sexton more comfortable with playing the hand aggressively and he ended up winning a large amount. Ungar saw another stud game going on across the room and gave Sexton $1,500 to go play in it. Sexton did and won an additional $4,000, of which he gave Ungar half and began to rebuild his bankroll.

Ungar also once won a large amount of money (over $1.5 million) on a series of horse races. That night, he took all his close friends out to a strip club and paid for the entire evening, which included numerous girls, Cristal champagne and a VIP booth. Sexton estimated the night cost Ungar $8,800, and he never once asked or expected anybody to pay him back.

Ungar never had a bank account in his own name, preferring to keep his money in safe deposit boxes in hotels across Las Vegas. He dismissed the notion of a bank or checking account. "You mean I can't go there at midnight and get my money out?", he asked (this was before the advent of ATMs). "That's ridiculous." Madeline noted that Ungar had no concept of how a bank account even worked since he paid for everything in cash. According to her, he believed that if you had a bank account and wrote a check, the check would be honored; not understanding that you need to take cash to the bank and deposit it to have the funds available to write a check first.

== Legacy ==
Ungar is regarded by many poker analysts and insiders as one of the greatest pure-talent players ever to play the game, but his long-time friend Mike Sexton said, "In the game of life, Stu Ungar was a loser."

During his poker career, he won five WSOP bracelets, and over $3.6 million in tournament winnings, with over $2 million coming from cashes at the WSOP. He won 10 major no-limit Texas hold 'em events (buy-ins $5,000 or higher) out of a total of 30 major tournaments he entered in his life, a record still unsurpassed in percentage terms.

Ungar also won the Main Event at the now-defunct Amarillo Slim's Super Bowl of Poker in 1984, 1988 and 1989, when it was considered by the poker world the world's second most prestigious poker title. As Amarillo Slim himself put it, "Stu musta won a million dollars in my tournaments."

A movie based loosely on his life, High Roller: The Stu Ungar Story (alternate title Stuey), was made in 2003. He was portrayed by Michael Imperioli.

Ungar was inducted posthumously into the Poker Hall of Fame in 2001.

His biography, One of a Kind: The Rise and Fall of Stuey 'The Kid' Ungar, the World's Greatest Poker Player by Nolan Dalla and Peter Alson was published in 2005. The Emmy-winning ESPN documentary One of a Kind: The Rise and Fall of Stu Ungar was broadcast in 2006. It contains interviews with his wife and daughter and several other people who knew him. It also featured excerpts from tapes he recorded in the last year of his life for an autobiography that never appeared.

== World Series of Poker bracelets ==
Year	Tournament	Prize (US$)
1980	$10,000 No Limit Hold'em World Championship	$365,000
1981	$10,000 Deuce to Seven Draw	$95,000
1981	$10,000 No Limit Hold'em World Championship	$375,000
1983	$5,000 Seven Card Stud	$110,000
1997	$10,000 No Limit Hold'em World Championship	$1,000,000
