= Dewey Tomko =

American poker player (born 1946)

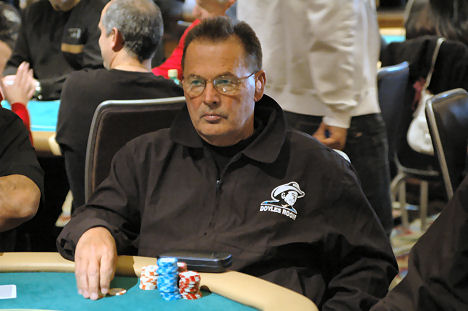
- Tomko at the 2006 World Poker Tour Bellagio Five Star Tournament
- Nickname: Dewey
- Born: Duane Tomko; December 31, 1946 (age 79)

World Series of Poker
- Bracelets: 3
- Money finishes: 43
- Highest WSOP Main Event finish: 2nd, 1982, 2001

World Poker Tour
- Title: None
- Final tables: 2
- Money finishes: 5

Duane "Dewey" Tomko (born December 31, 1946) is an American former kindergarten teacher turned professional poker player, based in Winter Haven, Florida.

Tomko was the runner-up in the World Series of Poker (WSOP) $10,000 no limit Texas hold'em Main Event in 1982 (to Jack Straus) and 2001 (to Carlos Mortensen). Besides his success in the Main Event, Tomko has won three WSOP bracelets, all in different variations of poker, in addition to various other tournament wins throughout his career.

== Early life ==
Tomko was born and raised in Glassport, Pennsylvania, a suburb of Pittsburgh. He began playing poker profitably as a 16-year-old in Pittsburgh pool halls, which allowed him to finance his education.

Tomko worked as a kindergarten teacher for several years, and often played poker through the night. After Tomko realised that playing poker was more profitable than his job, he left his full-time job, played poker full-time and invested a sum of his winnings into businesses.

== Poker career ==
Tomko won his first career WSOP bracelet in 1979, in the $1,000 No Limit Hold'em event. He defeated Duanne Hammrich heads-up to win the title and $48,000 cash prize.

At the 1984 WSOP, Dewey won two bracelets. First, he won the $10,000 Deuce-to-Seven Draw event for $105,000. The next day, he went back-to-back, winning the $5,000 Pot Limit Omaha with re-buys event for his third bracelet and $135,000.

In addition to his WSOP success, Tomko has made two World Poker Tour (WPT) final tables. He finished runner-up in the 2003 Five Diamond World Poker Classic for $552,853 and in fourth place in the Costa Rica Classic for $14,650.

As of 2008, Tomko had played every WSOP Main Event since 1974, the longest streak at the time.

Tomko finished in third place in the 2005 WSOP Deuce-To-Seven lowball event, worth $138,160. He made the final table of the first WSOP $50,000 buy-in H.O.R.S.E. tournament in 2006, which featured some of the best tournament and cash game poker players in the world. He finished in seventh place earning $343,200.

As of 2010, Tomko's total live tournament winnings exceeded $4,960,000. Just over half of his tournament winnings, $2,641,573, have come at the WSOP. He is a 2008 inductee into the Poker Hall of Fame. He was inducted alongside Henry Orenstein.

=== World Series of Poker bracelets ===
Year	Tournament	Prize (US$)
1979	$1,000 No Limit Hold'em	$48,000
1984	$10,000 Deuce-to-Seven Draw	$105,000
1984	$5,000 Pot Limit Omaha	$135,000

== Family ==
Tomko is married with a son, Derek, who encouraged him to return to playing poker tournaments.

== Golf ==
Tomko is an excellent golfer, spending much of his time on the golf course when he is not playing poker. He has played with many of his fellow high-stakes poker players like Doyle Brunson, Phil Ivey, and many others. One of his most frequent golf partners is fellow poker professional Hilbert Shirey, who also lives in Tomko's hometown of Winter Haven, Florida.

Rick Reilly chronicles a day with Dewey on a golf course in his book Who's Your Caddy.
