= Billy Baxter (poker player) =

American poker player (born 1940)

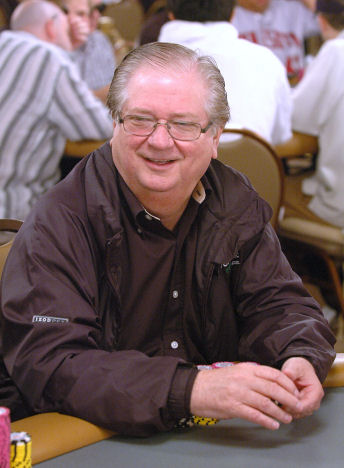
- Baxter in the 2006 World Series of Poker
- Born: William E. Baxter; 1940 (age 85–86); Augusta, Georgia, U.S.

World Series of Poker
- Bracelets: 7
- Money finishes: 35
- Highest WSOP Main Event finish: 22nd, 1997

World Poker Tour
- Title: None
- Final tables: 2
- Money finishes: 10

William E. Baxter Jr. (born September 21, 1940) is an American professional poker player and sports bettor. He has won numerous tournament titles in his career as a professional poker player, including seven World Series of Poker bracelets.

He was inducted into the Poker Hall of Fame in 2006.

== Early life ==
Born in Augusta, Georgia, Baxter started his gambling career like many others of his age by gambling in the pool halls. At the age of 14, he discovered he had a talent for hustling pool games.

At the age of 16, Baxter had saved $5,000 from his hustling money. At the age of 18, he was old enough to head to the taverns, where he discovered poker.

He attended Augusta College, but dropped out to pursue his poker career.

== Poker career ==
In 1975, Baxter took a honeymoon trip to Hawaii and ended up in the Las Vegas Valley, Nevada on the way back. He and his new bride lived in a hotel there for nine months while Baxter played poker for a living. It was there that he met fellow legends Doyle Brunson, Puggy Pearson and eventually Stu Ungar.

Baxter has won seven World Series of Poker bracelets over four decades. All of Baxter's bracelets are in lowball games, notably Razz, Deuce-to-Seven and California Lowball (draw). He ranks second all-time in non-Hold'em bracelets (7) behind Phil Ivey (10).

Baxter won an Ace-to-Five Lowball event at the 1981 Super Bowl of Poker. He won a Deuce To 7 Lowball event at the 1990 Super Bowl of Poker.

Baxter is known for staking Stu Ungar to the buy-in for Ungar's victory in the Main Event of the 1997 WSOP. Thereafter, he entered into an arrangement to stake Ungar in tournaments, but this was cut short by Ungar's continuing personal problems which led to the latter's death in 1998.

As of 2017, his total live tournament winnings exceed $2,600,000. His 35 cashes at the WSOP account for $1,093,044 of those winnings.

=== World Series of Poker bracelets ===
Year	Tournament	Prize (US$)
1975	$1,000 No Limit Deuce to Seven Draw	$35,000
1978	$10,000 No Limit Deuce to Seven Draw	$90,000
1982	$10,000 No Limit Deuce to Seven Draw	$95,000
1982	$2,500 No Limit Ace to Five Draw	$48,750
1987	$5,000 No Limit Deuce to Seven Draw	$153,000
1993	$5,000 No Limit Deuce to Seven Draw	$130,500
2002	$1,500 Razz	$64,860

== Baxter's poker income court case ==
Although Baxter is best known for his on-table poker accomplishments and staking Stu Ungar, he is also known for the case of William E. Baxter Jr. vs. the United States.

Baxter indeed sued the government for a $178,000 tax refund.

It was the judge's ruling that Baxter's poker winnings should be classified as "earned income", contrary to its previous classification of "unearned income" which was taxable up to 70 percent. Thus, in the process, Baxter's victory in this case has helped all American poker players by providing equal tax status to those earning a living as professional poker players.
