= Gabe Kaplan =

American actor, comedian, and poker player (born 1945)

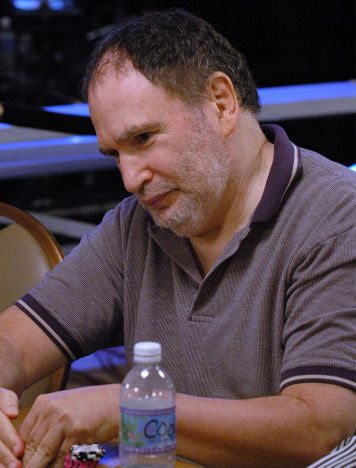
- Kaplan playing poker in 2006
- Born: Gabriel Weston Kaplan; March 31, 1945 (age 81); New York City, U.S.

World Series of Poker
- Bracelet: None
- Money finishes: 11
- Highest WSOP Main Event finish: 6th, 1980

World Poker Tour
- Title: None
- Final table: 1
- Money finishes: 3

Gabriel Weston Kaplan (born March 31, 1945) is an American actor, comedian, and professional poker player. He played the title character in the 1970s sitcom Welcome Back, Kotter. He later became a professional poker player and a commentator for the series High Stakes Poker on the Game Show Network.

== Early life ==
Kaplan was born in Brooklyn, New York City, to a Jewish family.

He was a student at New Utrecht High School in New Utrecht, Brooklyn, where he was raised, but did not graduate.

== Acting career ==
As a child, Kaplan had aspirations of being a Major League Baseball player. However, he was unable to make the roster of a minor league team and decided to pursue other interests. He began working as a bellman at a hotel in Lakewood, New Jersey. Touring comedians sometimes performed at the hotel, and Kaplan began to work toward his own career as a stand-up comedian. He honed his standup routine in 1964 in places such as the Cafe Tel Aviv at 250 West 72nd Street, New York City.

Kaplan's comedy was successful, and he toured the country with his act based on his childhood experiences in Brooklyn. He appeared five times on The Tonight Show Starring Johnny Carson from May 1973 to December 1974. During that time, he also recorded the comedy album Holes and Mello-Rolls, which included long routines about his high school days and other topics. The sitcom Welcome Back, Kotter, whose central characters he helped Eric Cohen and Alan Sacks create and whose core format he helped them to develop, was in part based on his comedy act. In the sitcom, Kaplan played Gabe Kotter, who returns as a teacher to the dysfunctional high school where he was a student. The series ran from 1975 to 1979, and Kaplan bought a home in Palm Springs, California with his earnings. "Up your nose with a rubber hose!", sanitized from the original album line "Up your hole with a Mello-Roll!", became an unlikely catchphrase from the show. It became so popular that a comedy record by Kaplan, Up Your Nose, was released by Elektra Records. The record, co-written and co-produced by Kaplan, dented the Billboard Hot 100 in January 1977, peaking at #93. The phrase also became the title of a board game for the series, which came with a small, green tube to be inserted in a nostril by an opposing player upon the conditions required to recite the catchphrase.

From 1976 to 1978 and again in 1981, Kaplan participated in the ABC celebrity athletic competition Battle of the Network Stars. For the first five competitions, Kaplan was the captain of the ABC network team. In the very first competition, Kaplan defeated Robert Conrad, who was participating in the event representing the NBC team as its captain, in a race much to Conrad's chagrin. Kaplan, who was 31 at the time, passed Conrad, then 40, with a strong sprint to the finish line, giving ABC television network the win with 175 points. In 1981, Kaplan returned to the competition as the team captain for the NBC side, as he was appearing in the NBC TV show Lewis & Clark.

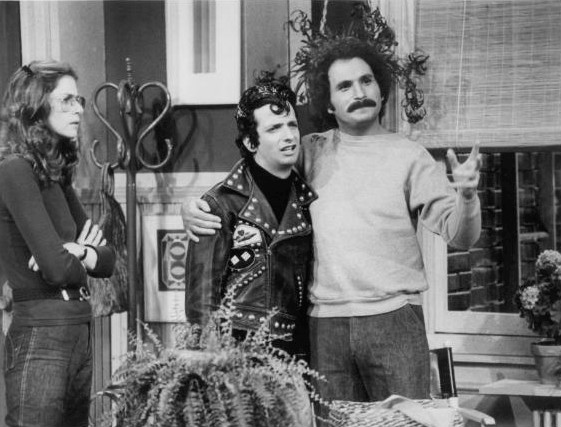
Kaplan in a scene from Welcome Back Kotter, with Marcia Strassman and Ron Palillo

After Welcome Back, Kotter, Kaplan continued with his stand-up act and was in several movies, including a starring role in Fast Break in 1979. In 1982, he portrayed Groucho Marx in a play titled Groucho. A filmed version of the play aired on HBO in 1983.

== Poker ==
Kaplan became involved in financial markets and poker during his acting career. He made his first appearance at the World Series of Poker in 1978. In 1980, Kaplan was considered one of poker's elite, as he won the main event at Amarillo Slim's Super Bowl of Poker and was presented with "a loving cup that was so enormous it made the gaudy gold bracelets given to the winners at the World Series of Poker look understated." Over the next five years his reputation was solidified as he made the final table at the Super Bowl's main event two more times.

In July 2004, Kaplan finished third in a World Poker Tour no-limit Texas hold 'em event, earning more than $250,000. He also finished second in the 2005 World Series of Poker $5,000 Limit Hold 'Em event, winning $222,515. Kaplan was joint TV commentator for the 1997 and 2002 WSOP events. In 2007, Kaplan won on NBC's Poker After Dark in the episode "Queens and Kings" after defeating Kristy Gazes heads-up and outlasting Howard Lederer, Ali Nejad, Vanessa Rousso and Annie Duke in a $20,000 buy-in, six-person No-Limit Texas Hold-Em winner-take-all Sit-and-Go.

In the 2007 World Series of Poker, Kaplan finished in ninth place in the $50,000 World Championship HORSE event, winning $131,424. As of June 2017, Kaplan's total live tournament winnings were $1,991,248. His eleven cashes at the WSOP were $539,159 of those winnings.

Kaplan won again on Poker After Dark during "Cowboys" week that first aired in February 2008 against Chris Ferguson, Andy Bloch, Chau Giang, Hoyt Corkins and Doyle Brunson. Kaplan's Poker After Dark win in the first week of the 2010 season (the "Commentators III" episode) was the greatest comeback in the show's history.

Kaplan returned to host High Stakes Poker when Season 8 aired on PokerGO in 2021 alongside A.J. Benza. He retired from his position after the first episode of Season 10, with Nick Schulman replacing him.

== Later activities ==
Kaplan resumed performing stand-up comedy and worked on adaptations of Welcome Back, Kotter. He still plays poker frequently and became a commentator for poker events and televised poker shows, including the National Heads-Up Poker Championship on NBC, High Stakes Poker on GSN, and the Intercontinental Poker Championship on CBS.

In 2007, he appeared in Zak Penn's improvisational comedy The Grand as Seth Schwartzman, father of brother-and-sister poker players. Also in 2007, Kaplan published a book titled Kotter's Back: E-mails from a Faded Celebrity to a Bewildered World. In the book, people react to the e-mailed claims by Kaplan, such as that he:

- has slept with more women than Wilt Chamberlain
- is an expert at Cossack dancing
- thinks he's smart enough to become a member of Mensa
- would like NASA to send him into orbit with Jimmy Carter and Dr. J

The book also describes his e-mails:

- to the Athens Olympic Committee offering to light the Olympic torch
- to AAA (the auto club) about signing up for Alcoholics Anonymous
- to the makers of Metamucil suggesting it feature constipated celebrities in its TV ads
- to the Postmaster General offering to have his picture on a stamp.

In January 2011, GSN announced that Norm Macdonald would replace Kaplan as host of High Stakes Poker. Kaplan would return alongside A.J. Benza when PokerGO relaunched the show for Season 8 in 2020.

In December 2022, PokerGO announced Season 10 of High Stakes Poker. The first episode of the new season aired on January 24, 2023, and during the episode, Kaplan hinted at retirement. On January 25, 2023, Kaplan officially retired as the High Stakes Poker commentator with a replacement to be named on the next episode.

== Filmography ==
Film and Television
Year	Title	Role	Notes
1975–1979	Welcome Back, Kotter	Gabe Kotter	Main role (95 episodes)
1976	The Love Boat	Stan Nichols	TV movie
1977	Police Story	Paul Cazenovia	Episode: "One of Our Cops Is Crazy"
1979	Fast Break	David Greene	
1981	Nobody's Perfekt	Dibley	
1981	Tulips	Leland Irving	
1981–82	Lewis & Clark	Stewart Lewis	Main role (13 episodes)
1982	Groucho	Groucho Marx	TV movie
1984	Murder, She Wrote	Freddy York	Episode: "Birds of a Feather"
1984	The Hoboken Chicken Emergency	Anthony DePalma	TV movie
2001	Jack the Dog	Richie	
2007	The Grand	Seth Schwartzman	
2018	BoJack Horseman	Abe Ziegler	Episode: "Head in the Clouds"
