= Jack Keller (poker player) =

American poker player (1942–2003)

- Nickname: Gentleman
- Born: December 29, 1942
- Died: December 5, 2003 (aged 60); Tunica, Mississippi, U.S.
- Favourite hand: 10x 10x (winning hand in his Main Event title)
World Series of Poker
- Bracelets: 3
- Money finishes: 26
- Highest WSOP Main Event finish: Winner, 1984

Jack Keller (December 29, 1942 – December 5, 2003) was an American professional poker player. He was inducted into the Poker Hall of Fame in 1994.

Keller won the 1984 World Series of Poker Main Event, three WSOP bracelets, and more than $1,580,000 in tournament play at the World Series of Poker during his career. He also won two Super Bowl of Poker Main Events when the SBOP was considered the second most prestigious tournament in the world.

Keller served in the United States Air Force prior to becoming a professional poker player. He had three children, including former poker professional Kathy Kolberg. He died in Tunica, Mississippi on December 5, 2003.

Keller's total lifetime tournament winnings were $3,900,424. His 26 cashes at the WSOP accounted for $1,610,940 of his lifetime winnings.

== World Series of Poker Bracelets ==
Year	Tournament	Prize (US$)
1984	$5,000 Seven Card Stud	$137,500
1984	$10,000 No Limit Hold'em World Championship	$660,000
1993	$1,500 Limit Omaha	$61,800
