= Chip Reese =

American poker player (1951–2007)

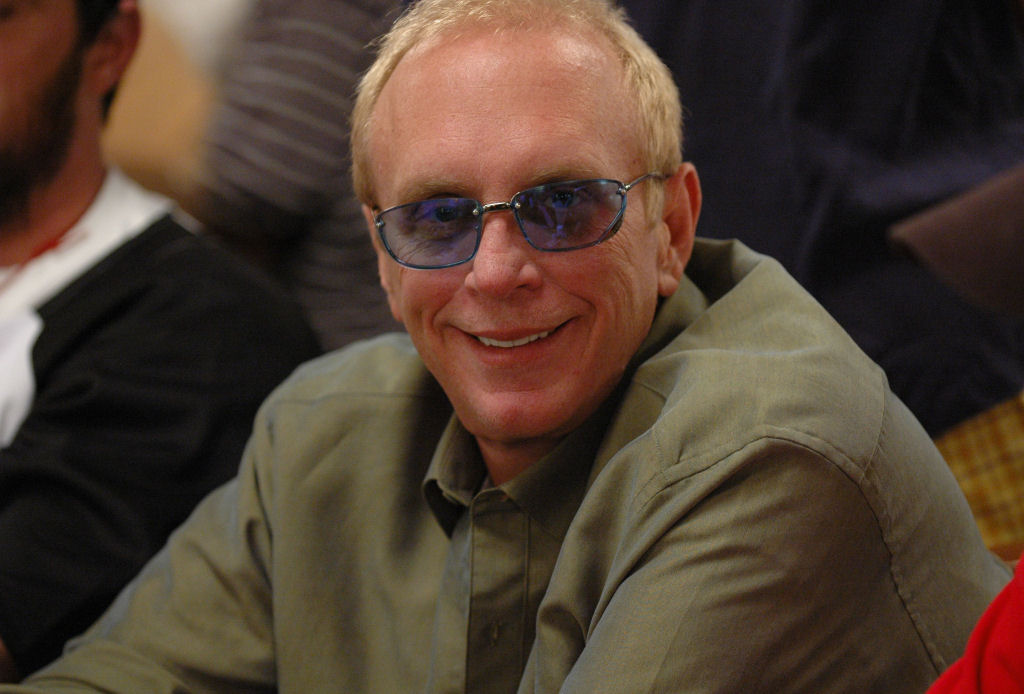
- Reese at the 2005 World Series of Poker
- Nickname: Chip
- Born: David Edward Reese; March 28, 1951; Centerville, Ohio, U.S.
- Died: December 4, 2007 (aged 56); Las Vegas, Nevada, U.S.

World Series of Poker
- Bracelets: 3
- Money finishes: 23
- Highest WSOP Main Event finish: 6th, 1979

World Poker Tour
- Title: None
- Final table: 1
- Money finishes: 5

David Edward "Chip" Reese (March 28, 1951 – December 4, 2007) was an American professional poker player and gambler from Centerville, Ohio. He is widely regarded as having been the greatest cash game poker player of his era.

== Early life ==
Reese suffered from rheumatic fever during his years at elementary school and had to stay at home for almost a year. During this time, his mother taught him how to play several board and card games. Reese later described himself as "a product of that year." By the age of six, he was regularly beating fifth-graders at poker. Alongside poker, Reese also became proficient at gin rummy and backgammon during this period. In high school, he was a football player and was on the debate team, winning an Ohio State Championship and going to the National Finals.

Reese attended Dartmouth after turning down an offer from Harvard. At Dartmouth, he became a member of Beta Theta Pi fraternity, played freshman football briefly, participated in debate, and majored in economics. Reese also had tremendous success in poker games against students and some of his professors. He taught his fraternity brothers to play a variety of card games, including bridge as well as many poker variants. Reese played bridge occasionally at the Grafton County Grange. His fraternity later named their chapter card room, the "David E. Reese Memorial Card Room" in his honor. Reese had a brief interest in Stanford Business School but decided instead to play poker professionally after winning $60,000 in a high/low split game in Las Vegas.

Reese's first visit to Las Vegas was so financially rewarding and so much fun, that he never left. He is thought to have hired someone to fly to Arizona to clean out his apartment and drive his car to Las Vegas.

== Poker career ==
Shortly afterwards, Reese collaborated on the seven-card stud section for Doyle Brunson's Super/System, the best-selling poker book of all time. In it, Brunson describes Reese as "one of the two finest young … poker players in the world" and the best seven-card stud player he had ever played. He won the $1,000 Seven Card Stud Split event at the World Series of Poker in 1978, and the $5,000 Seven Card Stud event in 1982. Reese decided to concentrate his efforts on cash games, however.Reese became a regular in The Big Game, the highest-stakes mixed cash game in Las Vegas, played at the Bellagio alongside Doyle Brunson, Lyle Berman, Bobby Baldwin and Johnny Chan. He later became the card room manager at the Dunes casino. Brunson says he once lost $6 million to Reese. In 1991, Reese became the youngest living player to be inducted into the Poker Hall of Fame. By 2006, he was still playing poker, also betting on sports.

At the 2006 World Series of Poker, Reese won the inaugural $50,000 H.O.R.S.E. event, taking home the $1,716,000 first prize when his A♣ Q♣ held up against Andy Bloch's 9♣ 8♠ in the final hand, on a board of J♠ 7♣ 7♠ 4♥ 4♠. This event was notable for having the largest buy-in (at the time) in WSOP history, as well as the longest heads-up battle with Reese and Bloch playing for seven hours and 286 hands. By comparison, the final table of the 2005 World Series of Poker Main Event lasted for a total of 232 hands.

As a tribute, the "David 'Chip' Reese Memorial Trophy" was inaugurated in 2008 as an additional prize for the winner of the $50,000 H.O.R.S.E. event at the World Series of Poker. The trophy depicts his winning hand of A♣ 7♣ 7♠ 4♥ 4♠. Starting in 2010, the trophy was awarded to the winner of The Poker Player's Championship, the replacement for the $50,000 H.O.R.S.E. event. Retaining the $50,000 buy-in, the event added no-limit hold 'em, pot-limit Omaha, and limit 2–7 triple draw to the five H.O.R.S.E. games, which culminated with a no-limit hold 'em final table in the first two years for tv (2010 and 2011), since which the mixed game format is played until the champion is crowned.

Reese's total live tournament winnings exceeded $3,900,000.

== Death ==
Reese died on December 4, 2007, at his Las Vegas home. Some sources state that Reese died in his sleep from the effects of pneumonia, while friends of Chip, including Barry Greenstein and Doyle Brunson, speculate that his death might have been related to an earlier gastric bypass that caused a blood clot.

Upon learning of Reese's death, Doyle Brunson stated, "He's certainly the best poker player that ever lived." World Series of Poker commissioner Jeffrey Pollack said upon his death that many consider Chip "the greatest cash game player who ever lived, but he was also a World Series of Poker legend."

Reese's house in Las Vegas was put up for sale on June 8, 2008, at a price of $5,699,500. He purchased the house with winnings from sports betting in baseball and from an investment in Jack Binion's Tunica casino.

== World Series of Poker bracelets ==
Year	Tournament	Prize (US$)
1978	$1,000 Seven-Card Stud Split	$19,200
1982	$5,000 Limit 7 Card Stud	$92,500
2006	$50,000 H.O.R.S.E. World Championship	$1,784,640
