= Seven-card stud =

Variant of card game poker

Seven-card stud, also known as Seven-Toed Pete or Down-The-River, is a variant of stud poker. Before the 2000s surge of popularity of Texas hold 'em, seven-card stud was one of the most widely played poker variants in home games across the United States and in casinos in the eastern part of the country. Although seven-card stud is not as common in casinos today, it is still played online. The game is commonly played with two to eight players; however, eight may require special rules for the last cards dealt if no players fold. Playing with nine players is possible.

In casino play, it is common to use a small ante and bring-in. In home games, using only an ante is typical.

Seven-card stud is the "S" game in H.O.R.S.E. and similar mixed game formats.

== Rules ==
The Poker game begins with each player being dealt two cards face down and one card face up. The player with the lowest-ranking up-card pays the bring-in, and betting proceeds after that in normal clockwise order. The bring-in is considered an open, so the next player in turn may not check. If two players have equally-ranked low cards, the card's suit may be used to break the tie and assign the bring-in (see high card by suit). If there is no bring-in, then the first betting round begins with the player showing the highest-ranking up-card, who may check. In this case, suit is not used to break ties. If two players have the same high up-card, the one first in clockwise rotation from the dealer acts first.

After the first betting round, another up-card is dealt to each player (after a burn card, and starting at the dealer's left as will all subsequent rounds), followed by a second betting round beginning with the player whose up-cards make the best poker hand. Since fewer than five cards are face up, this means no straights, flushes, or full houses will count for this purpose. On this and all subsequent betting rounds, the player whose face-up cards make the best poker hand will act first, and may check or bet up to the limit of the game.

The second round is followed by a third up-card and betting round, a fourth up-card and betting round, and finally a down-card, a fifth betting round, and showdown if necessary. Seven-card stud can be summarized therefore as "two down, four up, one down". Upon showdown, each player makes the best five-card poker hand they can out of the seven cards they were dealt.

Seven cards to eight players with an additional four burn cards makes 60 cards, whereas there are only 52 in the deck: in most games, this is not a problem because several players will have folded in early betting rounds. In the event that the deck is exhausted during play, the four previously dealt burn cards can be used, but if these are not sufficient, then the final round will have a single community card (which can be used by everyone) dealt into the center of the table in lieu of a down-card to each player. Discarded cards from a folded hand are not reused.

Stud poker players use the information they get from face-up cards to make strategic decisions. A player who sees a certain card folded is able to make decisions knowing that the card will never appear in another opponent's hand.

== Variants ==
There are several variations of Seven-Card Stud Poker in which each player is dealt a set number of cards. Not all of these variations can be found at poker rooms but they can be played at home.

1. "Down the River" is the basic variation of Seven-Card Stud Poker and this is the game played in poker rooms.
2. "Mississippi" removes the betting round between fourth and fifth streets, making only four betting rounds. This game also deals the fourth and fifth cards face up. This makes the game more closely resemble Texas Hold'em by having the same betting structure and the same number of down and up cards.
3. Another is "roll your own", in which four rounds of two cards each are dealt down, and each player must "roll" one card to face up, followed by a round of betting. Except for the first round, the card rolled may or may not be from the round just dealt.
4. "Queens and after": in this variant, all Queens are wild, and so is whatever card that is dealt face up that follows the Queen. All cards of that kind are now wild, both showing and in the hole. The interesting part is that if another Queen is dealt face-up, the wild card will change to whatever follows this Queen. The former card is no longer wild.
5. "Baseball": in this variant 3s and 9s are wild, and a 4 dealt face up gets an extra card.
6. "Low Chicago": Low spade in the hole gets half the pot. Similarly, "High Chicago" means high spade instead of low. Just "Chicago" can mean either.
7. "Acey Ducey": aces and twos are wild.
8. One-eyed Jacks or Suicide King can be specified as wild.
9. Razz is a lowball form of Seven-Card Stud, with the objective being to get the lowest hand possible.
10. In the variation called "Seven-Card Stud High-Low", the pot is split between the holder of the highest and lowest hand if the low hand is topped by at least an 8. Alternative names to this variation are Seven-Card Stud/8 and Seven-Card Stud Split.

== Sample deal ==
The sample deal below assumes that a game is being played by four players: Jimmy, who is dealing in the examples; Larry, who is sitting to his left; Craig to his left; and Katherine to Craig’s left.

All players ante 25¢. Jimmy deals each player two downcards and one upcard, beginning with Larry and ending with himself. Larry is dealt the 4♠, Craig the K♦, Katherine the 4♦, and Jimmy the 9♣. Because they are playing with a $1 bring-in, Katherine is required to start the betting with a $1 bring-in (her 4♦ is lower than 4♠ of Larry by suit). She had the option to open the betting for more, but she chose to bet only the required $1. The bring-in sets the current bet amount to $1, so Jimmy cannot check. He decides to call. Larry folds, indicating this by turning his upcard face down and discarding his cards. Craig raises to $3. Katherine folds, and Jimmy calls.

Jimmy now deals a second face-up card to each remaining player: Craig is dealt the J♣, and Jimmy the K♥. Jimmy’s two upcards make a poker hand of no pair, K-9-high, and Craig has K-J-high, so it is Craig's turn to bet. He checks, as does Jimmy, ending the betting round.

Another face up card is dealt: Craig gets the 10♥ and Jimmy gets the K♣. Jimmy now has a pair of kings showing, and Craig still has no pair, so Jimmy bets first. He bets $5, and Craig calls.

On the next round, Craig receives the 10♦, making his upcards K-J-10-10. Jimmy receives the 3♠. Jimmy’s upcards are 9-K-K-3; the pair of kings is still higher than Craig’s pair of tens, so he bets $5 and Craig calls.

Each player now receives a downcard. It is still Jimmy’s turn to bet because the downcard did not change either hand. He checks, Craig bets $10, and Jimmy calls. That closes the last betting round, and both players remain, so there is a showdown.

Since Jimmy called Craig’s bet, Craig shows his cards first: Q♠ 2♥ K♦ J♣ 10♥ 10♦ A♦. He can play A-K-Q-J-10, making an ace-high straight. Jimmy shows (or, seeing he cannot beat Craig’s straight, mucks his cards): 9♥ 5♦ 9♣ K♥ K♣ 3♠ 5♠. The best five-card poker hand he can play is K-K-9-9-5, making two pair, kings and nines. Craig wins the pot.

== In popular culture ==
At the end of Tennessee Williams' play A Streetcar Named Desire, the minor character Steve says "This game is seven-card stud," seemingly a reference to the narrative's transactional, game-like nature and its lack of propensity to change.
