= List of World Series of Poker ladies champions =

List of winners of ladies poker tournament

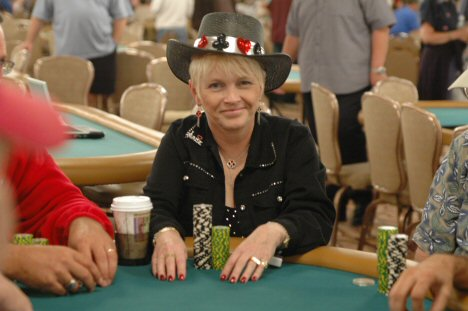
Susie Isaacs is one of only three women to win the Ladies Championship in back to back years.

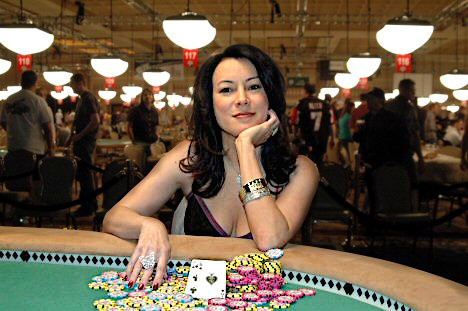
Jennifer Tilly, Academy Award nominee, won the 2005 Ladies Championship.

The World Series of Poker (WSOP), held annually in Las Vegas, is "the oldest, largest, most prestigious, and most media-hyped gaming competition in the world". The WSOP bracelet is considered the most coveted non-monetary prize a poker player can win. Since 1976, a bracelet has been awarded to the winner of every event at the annual WSOP, but titles won before 1976 are still counted as "bracelets".

The first WSOP was not a freeze out tournament, but rather an event with a set start and stop time and the winner determined by secret ballot. In 1973, a second event, five-card stud, was added. Over the years, most of the major poker variants have been played at least once. In 1977, the first Ladies only event was introduced in the form of $100 buy-in Stud Poker Tournament. Jackie McDaniels won that event to become the first Ladies Champion. She won one of the smallest prizes ($5,580) in WSOP history. By 2007, the popularity of the Ladies Event had grown to the point that it became the first Ladies-only event to have a prize pool greater than $1,000,000. The Ladies played Seven Card Stud for the event's first two decades, but have been playing Texas hold 'em since 2001.

Since its inception, four players have won multiple Ladies Championships: Barbara Enright, Susie Isaacs, Nani Dollison, and Shiina Okamoto. Isaacs, Dollison, and Okamoto won the event in consecutive years. Between 1991 and 1997, Isaacs set an event record by qualifying for a cash prize, known as finishing in-the-money, five times. The 1983 Ladies World Poker Championship was the first time that a person "of color", Carolyn Gardner, won a WSOP bracelet.

Traditionally, the Ladies event was the only event held on Mother Day. Due to complaints from mothers, the event was moved to a different day in 2004. Potential conflicts with Mother's Day no longer exist as the WSOP's new owner, Harrah's Casino, moved the event from late spring to the late summer.

The WSOP started offering a "WSOP Academy Ladies Only Poker Camp" in 2007. This week-long event is held at Caesars Palace and is designed to equip women with the tools to compete at the World Series of Poker. It is held the week leading up to the Ladies Championship. Every year since its inception, a participant from the camp has made it to the final table. In 2007, Ladies Champion Sally Anne Boyer participated in the camp. Patty Till, a 2008 attendee, finished in third place at the 2008 Ladies Championship.

== WSOP Ladies Championship events ==
	Elected to the Poker Hall of Fame.
Prize (US$)	The amount of money won for winning the Ladies Event that year.
Bracelet #	The bracelet number from the total number of bracelets won during their career.

Year	Event name	Entrants	Winner	Prize (US$)	Bracelet #	Runner-up	References
1977	$100 Ladies' Limit Seven Card Stud	93	(United States) Jackie McDaniels	$5,580	1	unknown	
1978	$200 Ladies' Limit Seven Card Stud	84	(United States) Terry King	$10,080	1	unknown	
1979	$400 Ladies' Limit Seven Card Stud	53	(United States) Barbara Freer	$12,720	1	(United States) Pat Sovoia	
1980	$400 Ladies' Limit Seven Card Stud	62	(United States) Deby Callihan	$14,880	1	(United States) Linda Davis	
1981	$400 Ladies' Limit Seven Card Stud	88	(United States) Ruth Godfrey	$17,600	1	(United States) Jackie Jean	
1982	$500 Ladies' Limit Seven Card Stud	64	(United States) June Field	$16,000	1	(United States) Jackie Jean	
1983	$500 Ladies' Limit Seven Card Stud	64	(United States) Carolyn Gardner	$16,000	1	(United States) Kim Bye	
1984	$500 Ladies' Limit Seven Card Stud	62	(United States) Karen Wolfson	$15,000	1	(Australia) Marsha Waggoner	
1985	$500 Ladies' Limit Seven Card Stud	74	(United States) Rose Pifer	$18,500	1	(United States) Kathy Hudson	
1986	$500 Ladies' Limit Seven Card Stud	82	(United States) Barbara Enright	$16,400	1 (of 3)	(United States) Betty Carey	
1987	$500 Ladies' Limit Seven Card Stud	84	(United States) Linda Ryke-Drucker	$16,800	1	(United States) Barbara Putterman	
1988	$500 Ladies' Limit Seven Card Stud	85	(United States) Loretta Huber	$17,000	1	(United States) Ester Rossi	
1989	$500 Ladies' Limit Seven Card Stud	93	(United States) Alma McClelland	$18,600	1	(United States) Adrienne Zoia	
1990	$500 Ladies' Limit Seven Card Stud	110	(United States) Marie Gabert	$22,000	1	(United Kingdom) Jenny Kaye	
1991	$500 Ladies' Limit Seven Card Stud	141	(United States) Donna Ward	$28,200	1	(United States) Toni Brown	
1992	$1,000 Ladies' Limit Seven Card Stud	155	(United States) Shari Flanzer	$38,000	1	(United States) Kim Alford	
1993	$1,000 Ladies' Limit Seven Card Stud	82	(United States) Phyllis Kessler	$32,800	1	(United States) Becki Vincent	
1994	$1,000 Ladies' Limit Seven Card Stud	96	(United States) Barbara Enright (2)	$38,400	2 (of 3)	(United States) Natalie Ryke	
1995	$1,000 Ladies' Limit Seven Card Stud	88	(United States) Starla Brodie	$35,200	2 (of 2)	(United States) Karen Wolfson	
1996	$1,000 Ladies' Limit Seven Card Stud	105	(United States) Susie Isaacs	$42,000	1 (of 2)	(United States) Nikki Harris	
1997	$1,000 Ladies' Limit Seven Card Stud	95	(United States) Susie Isaacs (2)	$38,000	2 (of 2)	(United States) Karen Wolfson	
1998	$1,000 Ladies' Limit Seven Card Stud	100	(Canada) Mandy Commanda	$40,000	1	(United States) Jerri Thomas	
1999	$1,000 Ladies' Limit Seven Card Stud	85	(Australia) Christina Pie	$34,000	1	(United States) LaVonne Joyce	
2000	$1,000 Ladies' Limit Hold'em/Seven Card Stud	133	(South Korea) Nani Dollison	$53,200	1 (of 3)	(United States) Martine Oules	
2001	$1,000 Ladies' Limit Hold'em/Seven Card Stud	106	(South Korea) Nani Dollison (2)	$41,130	3 (of 3)	(United States) Patty Gallagher	
2002	$1,000 Ladies' Limit Hold'em/Seven Card Stud	107	(United States) Catherine Brown	$39,880	1	(United States) Marie Sohn	
2003	$1,000 Ladies' Limit Hold'em/Seven Card Stud	112	(United States) Barb Rugolo	$40,700	1	(Taiwan) J. J. Liu	
2004	$1,000 Ladies' Limit Hold'em	201	(United States) Hung Doan	$58,530	1	(United States) Millie Shiu	
2005	$1,000 Ladies' No Limit Hold'em	601	(United States) Jennifer Tilly^{[a]}	$158,335	1	(United States) Anh Le	
2006	$1,000 Ladies' No Limit Hold'em	1,128	(United States) Mary Jones Meyer	$236,094	1	(United States) Shawnee Barton	
2007	$1,000 Ladies No Limit Hold'em Championship	1,286	(United States) Sally Boyer	$262,077	1	(United States) Anne Heft	
2008^{[b]}	$1,000 Ladies No Limit Hold'em Championship	1,190	(United States) Svetlana Gromenkova	$224,702	1	(United States) Anh Le	
2009	$1,000 Ladies No Limit Hold'em Championship	1,060	(United States) Lisa Hamilton	$195,390	1	(United States) Lori Bender	
2010	$1,000 Ladies No Limit Hold'em Championship	1,054	(France) Vanessa Hellebuyck	$192,132	1	(Denmark) Sidsel Boesen	
2011	$1,000 Ladies No Limit Hold'em Championship	1,055	(United States) Marsha Wolak	$192,344	1	(United States) Karina Jett	
2012	$1,000 Ladies No Limit Hold'em Championship	936	(United States) Yen Dang	$170,587	1	(United States) Debbie Pechac	
2013	$10,000 Ladies No Limit Hold'em Championship^{[c]}	954	(Canada) Kristen Bicknell	$173,922	1 (of 6)	(Australia) Leanne Haas	
2014	$10,000 Ladies No Limit Hold'em Championship^{[c]}	793	(United States) Haixia Zhang	$153,470	1	(United States) Mikiyo Aoki	
2015	$10,000/$1,000 Ladies No Limit Hold'em Championship^{[c]}	795	(United States) Jacquelyn Scott	$153,876	1	(United States) Hope Williams	
2016	$10,000/$1,000 Ladies No Limit Hold'em Championship^{[c]}	819	(United States) Courtney Kennedy	$149,108	1	(United States) Amanda Baker	
2017	$10,000/$1,000 Ladies No Limit Hold'em Championship^{[c]}	718	(Australia) Heidi May	$135,098	1	(United Kingdom) Deborah Worley-Roberts	
2018	$10,000/$1,000 Ladies No Limit Hold'em Championship^{[c]}	696	(United States) Jessica Dawley	$130,230	1	(United States) Jill Pike	
2019	$10,000/$1,000 Ladies No Limit Hold'em Championship^{[c]}	968	(South Korea) Jiyoung Kim	$167,308	1	(United States) Nancy Matson	
2020	not held						
2021	$10,000/$1,000 Ladies No Limit Hold'em Championship^{[c]}	644	(United States) Lara Eisenberg	$115,694	1	(United States) Debora Brooke	
2022	$10,000/$1,000 Ladies No Limit Hold'em Championship^{[c]}	1,074	(Austria) Jessica Teusl	$166,975	1	(United States) Julie Le	
2023	$10,000/$1,000 Ladies No Limit Hold'em Championship^{[c]}	1,295	(United States) Tamar Abraham	$192,167	1	(Japan) Shiina Okamoto	
2024	$10,000/$1,000 Ladies No Limit Hold'em Championship^{[c]}	1,245	(Japan) Shiina Okamoto	$171,732	1 (of 2)	(United States) Jamie Kerstetter	
2025	$10,000/$1,000 Ladies No Limit Hold'em Championship	1,368	(Japan) Shiina Okamoto (2)	$184,094	2 (of 2)	(United States) Heather Alcorn	
2026	$10,000/$1,000 Ladies No Limit Hold'em Championship	1,475	(United States) Skye Chen	$194,630	1	(United States) Aubrey Williams	

^{a} 2005 Ladies Champion Jennifer Tilly was the first non-poker celebrity to win a WSOP bracelet. Tilly had been nominated for an Academy Award for her role in Bullets over Broadway.

^{b} On 10 June 2008, three events awarded bracelets, including the Ladies event. This was the first time in WSOP history that three people living in the same city, New York, won bracelets on the same day. It was also the first time that a new "excessive celebration" penalty was implemented to minimize disruption from exuberant players.

^{c} From 2013, the entry fee was officially changed to $10,000 with a $9,000 "discount" for ladies. This was done to close a legal loophole used by men to enter the ladies event in several prior years.
