= 1996 World Series of Poker =

Series of poker tournaments

- Location: Binion's Horseshoe, Las Vegas, Nevada
- Dates: April 22 – May 14

Champion
- (United States) Huck Seed

The 1996 World Series of Poker (WSOP) was a series of poker tournaments held at Binion's Horseshoe.

== Events ==
There were 23 preliminary bracelet events at the 1996 World Series of Poker. Barbara Enright was the first woman to win an open event at the World Series of Poker.

#	Date	Event	Entries	Winner	Prize	Runner-up	Results
1	April 22, 1996	$1,500 Chinese Poker	62	Gregory Grivas (1/1)	$37,200	Charles Burris	Results
2	April 23, 1996	$2,000 Limit Hold'em	528	David Chiu (1/1)	$396,000	David Shu	Results
3	April 24, 1996	$1,500 Seven Card Stud	247	Gary Benson (1/1)	$148,200	Billy Cohen	Results
4	April 25, 1996	$1,500 Limit Omaha	171	Dody Roach (1/2)	$102,600	Men Nguyen (0/3)	Results
5	April 26, 1996	$1,500 Seven Card Stud Hi-Lo Split	245	John Cernuto (1/1)	$147,000	Lonnie Heimowitz	Results
6	April 27, 1996	$1,500 Razz	145	Randy Holland (1/1)	$87,000	Joe Aurelio	Results
7	April 28, 1996	$1,500 Omaha Hi-Lo Split	277	Adeeb Harb (1/1)	$155,815	Noli Francisco	Results
8	April 29, 1996	$1,500 No Limit Hold'em	405	John Morgan (1/1)	$227,815	George Githens	Results
9	April 30, 1996	$1,500 Pot Limit Omaha w/Rebuys	133	Jim Huntley (1/1)	$168,600	Phil Mazzella	Results
10	May 1, 1996	$1,500 Pot Limit Hold'em	278	Al Krux (1/1)	$156,375	Gerardo Crespi	Results
11	May 2, 1996	$2,500 Seven Card Stud Hi-Lo Split	94	Frank Thompson (1/1)	$94,000	Ted Forrest (0/3)	Results
12	May 2, 1996	$5,000 No Limit Deuce to Seven Draw w/Rebuys	24	Freddy Deeb (1/1)	$146,250	Mickey Appleman (0/3)	Results
13	May 3, 1996	$2,500 Omaha Hi-Lo Split	110	Men Nguyen (1/4)	$110,000	Matthias Rohnacher	Results
14	May 4, 1996	$1,500 Ace to Five Draw	119	Hans Lund (1/2)	$71,400	John Henson	Results
15	May 5, 1996	$5,000 Chinese Poker w/Rebuys	10	Jim Feldhouse (1/1)	$50,000	Eli Balas (0/1)	Results
16	May 6, 1996	$3,000 Limit Hold'em	167	Donny Kerr (1/1)	$200,400	Michael Halford	Results
17	May 7, 1996	$2,500 Seven Card Stud	144	Marty Sigel (1/2)	$144,000	Annie Duke	Results
18	May 8, 1996	$2,500 Pot Limit Omaha w/Rebuys	78	Sam Farha (1/1)	$145,000	Brent Carter (0/2)	Results
19	May 9, 1996	$2,500 Pot Limit Hold'em	180	Barbara Enright (1/3)	$180,000	Stan Goldstein	Results
20	May 10, 1996	$5,000 Seven Card Stud	65	Henry Orenstein (1/1)	$130,000	Humberto Brenes (0/2)	Results
21	May 11, 1996	$2,500 No Limit Hold'em	267	Mel Wiener (1/1)	$250,315	John Spadavecchia (0/1)	Results
22	May 12, 1996	$5,000 Limit Hold'em	118	Tony Ma (1/1)	$236,000	John Bonetti (0/3)	Results
23	May 13, 1996	$1,000 Ladies' Seven Card Stud	105	Susie Isaacs (1/1)	$42,000	Nikki Harris	Results
24	May 14, 1996	$10,000 No Limit Hold'em Main event	295	Huck Seed (1/2)	$1,000,000	Bruce Van Horn	Results

== Main Event ==
There were 295 entrants to the main event. Each entrant paid $10,000 to enter the tournament, with the top 27 players finishing in the money.

=== Final table ===
Name	Number of chips (percentage of total)	WSOP Bracelets*	WSOP Cashes*	WSOP Earnings*
(United States) John Bonetti	794,000 (26.9%)	3	16	$877,582
(United States) Huck Seed	632,000 (21.4%)	1	11	$392,508
(United States) An Tran	596,000 (20.2%)	1	22	$340,673
(United States) Bruce Van Horn	524,000 (17.8%)	0	2	$22,360
(United States) Men Nguyen	252,000 (8.5%)	4	20	$807,412
(Canada) Andre Boyer	153,000 (5.2%)	0	1	$8,010

*Career statistics prior to the beginning of the 1996 Main Event.

=== Final table results ===
Place	Name	Prize
1st	Huck Seed	$1,000,000
2nd	Bruce Van Horn	$585,000
3rd	John Bonetti	$341,250
4th	Men Nguyen	$195,000
5th	An Tran	$128,700
6th	Andre Boyer	$97,500

=== In The Money Finishes ===
NB: This list is restricted to In The Money finishers with an existing Wikipedia entry.

Place	Name	Prize
10th	David Chiu	$31,200
13th	Chau Giang	$27,300
16th	Berry Johnston	$23,400
17th	Dan Harrington	$23,400
18th	Frank Henderson	$23,400
19th	John Esposito	$19,500
21st	Peter Vilandos	$19,500
24th	Hal Kant	$19,500
25th	Donnacha O'Dea	$19,500
26th	Lucy Rokach	$19,500
