= 1995 World Series of Poker =

Series of poker tournaments

- Location: Binion's Horseshoe, Las Vegas, Nevada
- Dates: April 25 – May 24

Champion
- (United States) Dan Harrington

The 1995 World Series of Poker (WSOP) was a series of poker tournaments held at Binion's Horseshoe.

== Events ==
There were 23 preliminary bracelet events at the 1995 World Series of Poker.

#	Date	Event	Entries	Winner	Prize	Runner-up	Results
1	April 25, 1995	$1,500 Limit Hold'em	560	Christian Van Hees (1/1)	$315,000	Eli Balas (0/1)	Results
2	April 26, 1995	$1,500 Seven Card Stud	241	Valter Farina (1/1)	$144,600	Stavros Karabinas	Results
3	April 27, 1995	$1,500 Limit Omaha	152	Berry Johnston (1/4)	$91,200	Daniel Bakker	Results
4	April 28, 1995	$1,500 Chinese Poker	89	John Tsagaris (1/1)	$41,400	Bruce Cohen	Results
5	April 29, 1995	$1,500 Seven Card Stud Hi-Lo Split	212	Rod Peate (1/1)	$127,200	Steve Hohn	Results
6	April 30, 1995	$1,500 Razz	138	Mickey Sisskind (1/1)	$82,800	Leroy Baca	Results
7	May 1, 1995	$1,500 Omaha Hi-Lo Split	234	Max Stern (1/1)	$140,400	Cong Do	Results
8	May 2, 1995	$1,500 No Limit Hold'em	366	Richard Klamian (1/1)	$205,875	Byron Wolford (0/1)	Results
9	May 3, 1995	$1,500 Pot Limit Omaha w/Rebuys	134	Phil Earle (1/1)	$143,400	Ron Graham (0/1)	Results
10	May 4, 1995	$1,500 Pot Limit Hold'em	264	Peter Vilandos (1/1)	$148,500	Mick Cook	Results
11	May 5, 1995	$2,500 Seven Card Stud Hi-Lo Split	96	Men Nguyen (1/2)	$96,000	Steve Nixon	Results
12	May 6, 1995	$5,000 No Limit Deuce to Seven Draw w/Rebuys	26	John Bonetti (1/3)	$101,250	Johnny Chan (0/4)	Results
13	May 7, 1995	$2,500 Omaha Hi-Lo Split	119	Marlon De Los Santos (1/1)	$119,000	Jim Douglas	Results
14	May 8, 1995	$1,500 Ace to Five Draw	136	Clifford Roof (1/1)	$81,600	Tony Bolton	Results
15	May 9, 1995	$5,000 Chinese Poker w/Rebuys	24	Steve Zolotow (1/1)	$112,500	Doyle Brunson (0/7)	Results
16	May 10, 1995	$2,500 Limit Hold'em	186	Men Nguyen (2/3)	$186,000	Carl McKelvey	Results
17	May 11, 1995	$2,500 Seven Card Stud	140	Dan Robison (1/1)	$140,000	John Spadavecchia (0/1)	Results
18	May 12, 1995	$2,500 Pot Limit Omaha w/Rebuys	82	Hilbert Shirey (1/2)	$137,000	Phil Mazzella	Results
19	May 13, 1995	$2,500 Pot Limit Hold'em	163	Hilbert Shirey (2/3)	$163,000	Tom Jacobs	Results
20	May 14, 1995	$5,000 Seven Card Stud	77	Anthony DeAngelo (1/1)	$154,000	T. J. Cloutier (0/3)	Results
21	May 15, 1995	$2,500 No Limit Hold'em	249	Dan Harrington (1/1)	$249,000	John Gordon	Results
22	May 16, 1995	$5,000 Limit Hold'em	117	Mickey Appleman (1/3)	$234,000	Humberto Brenes (0/2)	Results
23	May 17, 1995	$1,000 Ladies' Seven Card Stud	88	Starla Brodie (1/2)	$35,200	Karen Wolfson (0/1)	Results
24	May 18, 1995	$10,000 No Limit Hold'em Main Event	273	Dan Harrington (2/2)	$1,000,000	Howard Goldfarb	Results

== Main Event ==
There were 273 entrants to the main event. Each paid $10,000 to enter the tournament, with the top 27 players finishing in the money. 1992 Main Event champion Hamid Dastmalchi made the final table looking for his second Main Event title but fell short. Harrington went on to make two more Main Event final tables in his poker career, 2003 and 2004.

=== Final table ===
Name	Number of chips (percentage of total)	WSOP Bracelets*	WSOP Cashes*	WSOP Earnings*
(Canada) Howard Goldfarb	1,194,000 (43.7%)	0	1	$16,800
(United States) Dan Harrington	532,000 (19.5%)	1	4	$297,250
(United States) Brent Carter	319,000 (11.7%)	2	19	$418,104
(United States) Chuck Thompson	254,000 (9.3%)	0	2	$45,913
(United States) Hamid Dastmalchi	232,000 (8.5%)	3	9	$1,427,760
(United States) Barbara Enright	199,000 (7.3%)	2	3	$56,780

*Career statistics prior to the beginning of the 1995 Main Event.

=== Final table results ===
Place	Name	Prize
1st	Dan Harrington	$1,000,000
2nd	Howard Goldfarb	$519,000
3rd	Brent Carter	$302,250
4th	Hamid Dastmalchi	$173,000
5th	Barbara Enright	$114,180
6th	Chuck Thompson	$86,500

=== In The Money Finishes ===
NB: This list is restricted to In The Money finishers with an existing Wikipedia entry.

Place	Name	Prize
7th	Tom Franklin	$69,200
8th	Henry Orenstein	$51,900
12th	John Esposito	$27,680
15th	Billy Argyros	$24,220
17th	Freddy Deeb	$20,760
20th	Jason Lester	$17,300
21st	Berry Johnston	$17,300
22nd	David Baxter	$17,300
23rd	Mike Sexton	$17,300
26th	Hal Kant	$17,300
