= 1983 Super Bowl of Poker =

1983 poker tournament

The Super Bowl of Poker (also known as Amarillo Slim's Super Bowl of Poker or SBOP) was the second most prestigious poker tournament in the world during the 1980s. While the World Series of Poker was already drawing larger crowds as more and more amateurs sought it out, the SBOP "was an affair limited almost exclusively to pros and hard-core amateurs."

Prior to 1979, the only high dollar tournament a person could enter was the WSOP. 1972 WSOP Main Event Champion and outspoken ambassador for poker, Amarillo Slim saw this as an opportunity. "The World Series of Poker was so successful that everybody wanted more than one tournament," he said. Slim called upon his connections and friendships with poker's elite to start a new tournament in the February 1979. Slim modelled his SBOP after the WSOP with several events and a $10,000 Texas Hold'em Main Event.

One of the principal differences between the WSOP and the SBOP was the prize structure. The WSOP's prize structure was flat ensuring more people received smaller pieces of the prize pool. The SBOP typically used a 60-30-10 payout structure. In other words, only the first three places received money and generally in the ratio of 60% to first place, 30% to second place, and 10% to third. This payment schedule predominated the SBOP for the first 5 years of the event, but as the event grew the number of payouts increased while keeping the payout schedule top heavy.

== 1983 Tournament ==
In 1983, 5 Poker Hall of Famers made it to the cash in various tournaments at the SBOP. Jack Straus lost to two time World Series of Poker bracelet winner Hans Lund in the SBOP Main Event. Berry Johnston would finish third in one event while Bobby Baldwin would make it to two cashes. Billy Baxter, who would later gain fame for suing the IRS in Baxter v United States, also made it to the cash in one event. Sarge Ferris, a low-key but much respected professional player who was later inducted into the Poker Hall of Fame, won the No Limit 2-7 Lowball.

The 1983, tournament also witnessed Gabe Kaplan from Welcome Back, Kotter win his second SBOP tournament. When Welcome Back, Kotter went off the air in 1979, its lead character started a career in poker. During the early 1980s, Kaplan's success, particularly at the SBOP, led him to be considered among poker's elite. Kaplan made money in two events and won one.

== Key ==
*	Elected to the Poker Hall of Fame.
†	Denotes player who is deceased.
Place	The place in which people finish.
Name	The name of the player
Prize (US$)	Event prize money

=== Event 1: $ 10,000 No Limit Hold'em ===
- Number of buy-ins: 42
- Total prize pool: $502,500
- Number of payouts: 7

Final table
Place	Name	Prize
1st	Hans Lund	$275,000
2nd	Jack Straus*	$62,500
3rd	Al Either	$55,000
4th	Gary Lundberg	$27,500
5th	Junior Whited	$27,500
6th	Ron Fielder	$27,500
7th	Fred Davis	$27,500

=== Event 2: Ace-to-Five Lowball ===
- Number of buy-ins: Unknown
- Total prize pool: Unknown
- Number of payouts: 1

Final table
Place	Name	Prize
1st	Gabe Kaplan	Unknown

=== Event 3: $ 500 Limit Hold'em ===
- Number of buy-ins: 144
- Total prize pool: $72,000
- Number of payouts: 3

Final table
Place	Name	Prize
1st	J. C. Pearson	$43,200
1st	Dale Roback	$21,600
1st	Art Youngblood	$7,200

=== Event 4: $ 1,000 Ace-to-Five Lowball ===
- Number of buy-ins: 35
- Total prize pool: $35,000
- Number of payouts: 3

Final table
Place	Name	Prize
1st	Jack Niles	$21,000
2nd	Gabe Kaplan	$10,500
3rd	Bob Brooks	$3,500

=== Event 5: $ 500 Limit Seven Card Stud ===
- Number of buy-ins: 78
- Total prize pool: $39,000
- Number of payouts: 3

Final table
Place	Name	Prize
1st	Don Williams	$23,400
2nd	Elaine Booth	$11,700
3rd	Jeff Yass	$3,900

=== Event 6: $ 1,000 Limit Hold'em ===
- Number of buy-ins: 78
- Total prize pool: $39,000
- Number of payouts: 3

Final table
Place	Name	Prize
1st	Gary Lundgren	$34,500
2nd	Eddie Schwettman	$17,400
3rd	Norman Solomon	$5,800

=== Event 7: $ 5,000 Limit Seven Card Stud ===
- Number of buy-ins: Unknown
- Total prize pool: $116,000
- Number of payouts: 3

Final table
Place	Name	Prize
1st	Deacon Smith	$66,000
2nd	Ken Flaton	$33,000
3rd	Bobby Baldwin*	$17,000

=== Event 8: $ 5,000 Limit A-5 Lowball ===
- Number of buy-ins: 18
- Total prize pool: $90,000
- Number of payouts: 3

Final table
Place	Name	Prize
1st	Dick Carson	$48,000
2nd	Billy Baxter*	$24,000
3rd	Perry Green	$18,000

=== Event 9: $ 1,000 Limit A-5 Lowball ===
- Number of buy-ins: Unknown
- Total prize pool: $21,200
- Number of payouts: 3

Final table
Place	Name	Prize
1st	David Baxter	$13,000
2nd	George Roumanis	$6,900
3rd	Robert Turner	$2,300

=== Event 10: No Limit 2-7 Lowball ===
- Number of buy-ins: Unknown
- Total prize pool: $120,000
- Number of payouts: 3

Final table
Place	Name	Prize
1st	Sarge Ferris*	$72,000
2nd	Sam Nassi	$36,000
3rd	Bobby Baldwin*	$12,000

=== Event 11: $ 500 Limit Omaha ===
- Number of buy-ins: 42
- Total prize pool: $21,000
- Number of payouts: 3

Final table
Place	Name	Prize
1st	Billy Thomas	$12,600
2nd	Tim Tang	$6,300
3rd	Berry Johnston*	$2,100

=== Event 12: $ 500 Limit Hold'em ===
- Number of buy-ins: Unknown
- Total prize pool: $77,750
- Number of payouts: 3

Final table
Place	Name	Prize
1st	Eddie Schwettman	$46,500
2nd	Ray Cooke	$2,350
3rd	Jack McClelland	$7,750

=== Event 13: $ 2,500 Limit Seven Card Stud Hi/Lo ===
- Number of buy-ins: Unknown
- Total prize pool: $60,000
- Number of payouts: 3

Final table
Place	Name	Prize
1st	Tom Cress	$36,000
2nd	Austin Squatty	$18,000
3rd	Chris Rochelle	$7,750

=== Event 14: $ 1,000 No Limit Hold'em ===
- Number of buy-ins: 128
- Total prize pool: $128,000
- Number of payouts: 3

Final table
Place	Name	Prize
1st	Curtis Skinner	$80,000
2nd	Jim Waltenberg	$32,000
3rd	Austin Squatty	$16,000
