= Bruce Van Horn =

American poker player and pathologist

World Series of Poker
- Bracelet: None
- Final tables: 5
- Money finishes: 8
- Highest WSOP Main Event finish: 2nd, 1996

World Poker Tour
- Title: None
- Final table: None
- Money finish: 1

Bruce Van Horn is an American pathologist from Ada, Oklahoma with poker tournament experience and success. He is most noted for his 2nd-place finish to Huck Seed in the $10,000 main event at the 1996 World Series of Poker, for which he won $580,000.

In 2007, Van Horn made the final table of the $1,500 Pot Limit Hold'em event. He finished in 6th place, earning $36,732. He was also featured in a segment aired by ESPN during the episode where he was at the final table. In the segment, a number of top professional players, including T. J. Cloutier, Scotty Nguyen, and Chris Ferguson, were asked who the second-place finisher at the 1996 WSOP Main Event was. No one knew the answer because 1996 was one of the few years that the Main Event final table was not broadcast. Van Horn commented at the final table, in conversation with some of the other players, that he was happy that this event was being recorded so this time there would be proof that he had made the final table.

As of 2008, his total live tournament winnings exceed $850,000. His 8 cashes at the WSOP account for $752,099 of those winnings.
