= World Poker Tour season 2 results =

Below are the results of season two of the World Poker Tour television series (2003–2004).

== Results ==
=== Grand Prix de Paris ===
- Casino: Aviation Club de France, Paris
- Buy-in: €10,000
- 4-day event: July 10, 2003 to July 13, 2003
- Number of entries: 96
- Total prize pool: €894,400 (US$1,028,826)
- Number of payouts: 9
- Winning Hand: A♥ 10♦

Final table
Place	Name	Prize
1st	David Benyamine	€357,200 ($410,886)
2nd	Jan Boubli	€178,000 ($205,443)
3rd	George Paravoliasakis	€134,000 ($154,140)
4th	Jamie Posner	€80,500 ($92,599)
5th	Erick Lindgren	€53,600 ($61,656)
6th	Lee Salem	€35,700 ($41,066)

=== Legends of Poker ===
- Casino: Bicycle Casino, Los Angeles
- Buy-in: $5,000
- 3-day event: September 1, 2003 to September 3, 2003
- Number of entries: 309
- Total prize pool: $1,545,000
- Number of payouts: 27
- Winning hand: 9♥ 7♠

Final table
Place	Name	Prize
1st	Mel Judah	$579,375
2nd	Paul Phillips	$293,550
3rd	T. J. Cloutier	$146,775
4th	Chip Jett	$100,425
5th	Farzad Bonyadi	$69,525
6th	Phil Laak	$54,075

=== Borgata Poker Open ===
- Casino: Borgata, Atlantic City
- Buy-in: $5,000
- 3-day event: September 20, 2003 to September 22, 2003
- Number of entries: 235
- Total prize pool: $1,175,000
- Number of payouts: 18
- Winning Hand: K♣ 5♥

Final table
Place	Name	Prize
1st	Noli Francisco	$470,000
2nd	Charlie Shoten	$235,000
3rd	David Oppenheim	$117,500
4th	Carlos Mortensen	$70,500
5th	Mickey Seagle	$52,875
6th	Randy Burger	$41,125

=== Ultimate Poker Classic ===
- Casino: Radisson Aruba Resort & Casino, Palm Beach, Aruba
- Buy-in: $4,000
- 1-day event: October 18, 2003
- Number of entries: 436
- Total prize pool: $1,697,460
- Number of payouts: 20
- Winning Hand: Q♦ 3♦

Final table
Place	Name	Prize
1st	Erick Lindgren	$500,000
2nd	Daniel Larsson	$300,745
3rd	Anthony Fagan	$194,230
4th	Barry Shulman	$112,780
5th	Ted Harrington	$68,920
6th	Rick Casper	$43,860

=== World Poker Finals ===
- Casino: Foxwoods Resort Casino, Mashantucket, Connecticut
- Buy-in: $10,000
- 3-Day event: November 14, 2003 to November 17, 2003
- Number of entries: 313
- Total prize pool: $3,155,000
- Number of payouts: 27
- Winning Hand: A♣ 9♦

Final table
Place	Name	Prize
1st	Hoyt Corkins	$1,089,200
2nd	Mohamed Ibrahim	$563,400
3rd	Phil Hellmuth	$281,700
4th	Chris Ackerman	$226,925
5th	Vellaisamy Senthilkumar	$164,325
6th	Brian Haveson	$117,375

=== Five Diamond World Poker Classic ===
- Casino: Bellagio, Paradise, Nevada
- Buy-in: $10,000
- 4-day event: December 15, 2003 to December 18, 2003
- Number of entries: 314
- Total prize pool: $3,044,750
- Number of payouts: 36
- Winning Hand: 7♦ 7♥

Final table
Place	Name	Prize
1st	Paul Phillips	$1,101,908
2nd	Dewey Tomko	$552,853
3rd	Gus Hansen	$276,426
4th	Abe Mosseri	$174,585
5th	Tino Lechich	$130,940
6th	Mel Judah	$101,842

=== PokerStars Caribbean Poker Adventure ===
- Buy-in: $7,500
- 1-day event: January 25, 2004
- Number of entries: 221
- Total prize pool: $1,657,501
- Number of payouts: 27
- Winning Hand: 7♦ 3♣

Final table
Place	Name	Prize
1st	Gus Hansen	$455,780
2nd	Hoyt Corkins	$290,065
3rd	Daniel Negreanu	$192,270
4th	Michael Benedetto	$132,600
5th	John D'Agostino	$99,450
6th	Remco Schrijvers	$74,590

=== Jack Binion World Poker Open ===
- Casino: Horseshoe Casino & Hotel, Tunica
- Buy-in: $10,000
- 4-day event: January 26, 2004 to January 29, 2004
- Number of entries: 367
- Total prize pool: $3,455,050
- Number of payouts: 27
- Winning Hand: Q♦ 10♣

Final table
Place	Name	Prize
1st	Barry Greenstein	$1,278,370
2nd	Randy Jensen	$656,460
3rd	James Tippin	$328,230
4th	Chip Reese	$207,304
5th	Can Kim Hua	$155,477
6th	Tony Hartmann	$120,927

=== L.A. Poker Classic ===
- Casino: Commerce Casino, Los Angeles
- Buy-in: $10,000
- 4-day event: February 21, 2004 to February 24, 2004
- Number of entries: 382
- Total prize pool: $3,781,500
- Number of payouts: 27
- Winning Hand: A♥ A♣

Final table
Place	Name	Prize
1st	Antonio Esfandiari	$1,399,135
2nd	Vinny Vinh	$718,485
3rd	Mike Keohan	$359,245
4th	Bill Gazes	$226,890
5th	Adam Schoenfeld	$170,170
6th	David Benyamine	$132,355

=== WPT Invitational ===
- Casino: Commerce Casino, Los Angeles
- Buy-in:
- 2-day event: February 25, 2026 to February 26, 2004
- Number of entries: 196
- Total prize pool: $200,000
- Number of payouts: 9
- Winning hand: A♣ K♣

Final table
Place	Name	Prize
1st	Phil Laak	$100,000
2nd	Humberto Brenes	$38,000
3rd	John Juanda	$18,000
4th	Joe Cassidy	$14,000
5th	Harry Demetriou	$10,000
6th	Antonio Esfandiari	$8,000

=== Bay 101 Shooting Star ===
- Casino: Bay 101, San José
- Buy-in: $5,000
- 3-day event: March 3, 2004 to March 5, 2004
- Number of entries: 243
- Total prize pool: $1,125,000
- Number of payouts: 27
- Winning Hand: A♣ 7♥

Final table
Place	Name	Prize
1st	Phil Gordon	$360,000
2nd	Chris Moneymaker	$200,000
3rd	Masoud Shojaei	$103,300
4th	Scott Wilson	$79,800
5th	Susan Kim	$68,400
6th	Mark Mache	$57,000

=== Party Poker Million ===
- Casino:
- Buy-in: $7,000
- 2-day event: March 18, 2004
- Number of entries: 546
- Total prize pool: $3,682,337
- Number of payouts: 90
- Winning hand: A♥ 3♦

Final table
Place	Name	Prize
1st	Erick Lindgren	$1,000,000
2nd	Daniel Negreanu	$675,178
3rd	Chris Hinchcliffe	$441,463
4th	Steve Zolotow	$259,684
5th	Barry Greenstein	$194,763
6th	Scotty Nguyen	$129,842

=== World Poker Challenge ===
- Casino: Reno Hilton, Reno
- Buy-in: $5,000
- 3-day event: March 30, 2004 to April 1, 2004
- Number of entries: 342
- Total prize pool: $1,658,700
- Number of payouts: 27
- Winning Hand: J♠ 6♥

Final table
Place	Name	Prize
1st	Mike Kinney	$629,469
2nd	Paul Clark	$310,403
3rd	Harry Knopp	$155,202
4th	Peter Muller	$98,022
5th	Tony Bloom	$73,517
6th	Young Phan	$57,180

=== WPT Championship ===
- Casino: Bellagio, Las Vegas
- Buy-in: $25,000
- 5-day event: April 19, 2004 to April 23, 2004
- Number of entries: 343
- Total prize pool: $8,342,000
- Number of payouts: 50
- Winning Hand: 10♠ 10♦

Final table
Place	Name	Prize
1st	Martin de Knijff	$2,728,356
2nd	Hasan Habib	$1,372,223
3rd	Matt Matros	$706,903
4th	Richard Grijalva	$457,408
5th	Russell Rosenblum	$332,660
6th	Steve Brecher	$232,862

== Other Events ==
During season 2 of the WPT there was one special event that did not apply to the Player of the Year standings:

- The WPT Invitational - February 25–26, 2004 - Commerce Casino - postscript to Event #9: L.A. Poker Classic
