= An Tran =

Vietnamese-American poker player (born 1952)

- Nickname: The Boss
- Born: July 29, 1952 (age 74); Saigon, Vietnam

World Series of Poker
- Bracelet: 1
- Money finishes: 43
- Highest WSOP Main Event finish: 5th, 1996

World Poker Tour
- Title: None
- Final table: 1
- Money finish: 1

An Tran (born July 29, 1952) is a Vietnamese-American professional poker player, now living in Las Vegas, Nevada.

== Poker career ==
Tran began playing poker in the mid-1970s and first finished in the money of a World Series of Poker (WSOP) event in 1989 in the $2,000 no limit hold 'em event. In the same year he finished 24th in the $10,000 no limit hold'em Main Event.

Tran has made numerous final tables since then, and won a WSOP bracelet in the 1991 $1,500 pot limit Omaha event, defeating Chris Björin in the final heads-up confrontation.

In 1992, Tran set the all-time record for paid final tables in one year with six. Despite this, he failed to finish higher than 3rd in any event that year.

Tran also made one final table in the WSOP main event, finishing 5th in 1996. He narrowly missed out on winning a second WSOP bracelet in 2004 when he finished 2nd to John Hennigan in the $5,000 limit hold'em event.

Tran has been under what he calls a "curse" after selling his one and only World Series of Poker bracelet for an undisclosed amount. Since selling the bracelet, Tran has not won another WSOP event.

Tran made a World Poker Tour (WPT) final table in January 2006, finishing 5th in the Gold Strike World Poker Open.

As of 2016, his total live tournament winnings exceed $2,725,000. His 43 cashes at the WSOP account for $934,194 of those winnings.
