= Andre Boyer (poker player) =

French-Canadian poker player

André Boyer

World Series of Poker
- Bracelets: 2
- Money finishes: 30
- Highest WSOP Main Event finish: 6th, 1996

André Boyer is a French-Canadian poker player from Acton Vale, Quebec, Canada, who has won two World Series of Poker bracelets.

Boyer first cashed in the World Series of Poker in 1996, and also made the $10,000 No Limit Hold'em Main Event final table that year. He finished in 6th place, winning $97,500 in that tournament which was won by Huck Seed. He also cashed in the 2007 main event, earning $29,883 for his 434th place finish.

Boyer won a WSOP bracelet in 2005 in the $3,000 No Limit Hold'em event, earning $682,810 in addition to the title. He defeated a final table that included John Duthie and Matthew Glantz, whom Boyer defeated heads-up to win the title.

In June 2015, aged 72, Boyer won his second bracelet in Event #34, a $1,500 Split-Format No Limit Hold'em tournament at the 2015 World Series of Poker, defeating a field of 873 entrants for $250,483. The format ran as full-ring play on the first day, six-max on the second, and a heads-up bracket on the third.

Boyer has made numerous other WSOP and WSOP Circuit cashes. Among them are a runner-up finish at a 2016 WSOP Circuit event at the Montreal Casino ($365 buy-in No Limit Hold'em, 2nd of 214 for $9,921). His most recent recorded live cash on The Hendon Mob database was in September 2017. Boyer beat Frenchman Erwann Pecheux heads-up in the final. Boyer said he still ranked his first bracelet as the most special moment of his career.

Boyer's recorded live tournament earnings total about $1.6 million, with a best live cash of $682,810 for the 2005 bracelet win.

He lived in Las Vegas for 18 years in the 1980s, 1990s and 2000s but has since moved back to his native Quebec where he was the colour commentator for the World Series of Poker French-Canadian broadcasts on RDS between 2003 and 2008. After his first bracelet win in 2005, Boyer devoted time to growing poker in Quebec, where games had been mostly seven-card stud rather than hold'em; he helped a friend run a poker league and worked as an analyst on a local poker show. He is from Acton Vale, Quebec.

World Series of Poker bracelets
Year	Tournament	Prize (US$)
2005	$3,000 No Limit Hold'em	$682,810
2015	$1,500 Split Format No Limit Hold'em	$250,483
