= Lee Salem =

Lee Salem may refer to:

- Lee Salem (poker player), American poker player
- Lee Salem (editor) (1946–2019), American comic strip editor
