= Don Holt =

American poker player

- Nickname: Tucson

World Series of Poker
- Bracelet: 1
- Money finishes: 8
- Highest WSOP Main Event finish: 2nd, 1991

Don Holt is an American poker player. He has won a World Series of Poker (WSOP) bracelet and has cashed in various events at the WSOP including the Main Event.

Holt began playing at the WSOP in the 1980s. He won his bracelet at the 1989 World Series of Poker in the US$5,000 seven card stud event, defeating three-time bracelet winner, David Sklansky heads-up. That same year, he had his other first place tournament finish, also in seven card stud, at Amarillo Slim's Super Bowl of Poker.

Holt finished second in a seven card stud eight-or-better event in 1998.

Holt has also cashed in the WSOP Main Event several times. His highest Main Event finish came in 1991, when he finished in second place to Brad Daugherty. For his second-place finish, Holt won $402,500, which is his largest cash to date at the World Series of Poker.

Holt's total live tournament winnings exceed $875,000. His 8 cashes as the WSOP account for $672,960 of those winnings.
