= 1991 World Series of Poker =

Series of poker tournaments

- Location: Binion's Horseshoe, Las Vegas, Nevada
- Dates: April 26 – May 13

Champion
- (United States) Brad Daugherty

The 1991 World Series of Poker (WSOP) was a series of poker tournaments held at Binion's Horseshoe from April 26 to May 13, 1991. The 1991 World Series featured a then-record 18 bracelet events.

== Events ==
The 1991 WSOP featured 17 preliminary events. Jay Heimowitz became the second player in WSOP history to win bracelets in three different decades.

#	Date	Event	Entries	Winner	Prize	Runner-up	Results
1	April 26, 1991	$1,500 Razz	154	Charles Wight (1/1)	$231,000	Steve Kopp	Results
2	April 27, 1991	$5,000 Limit Hold'em	105	Byron Wolford (1/1)	$210,000	Erik Seidel	Results
3	April 28, 1991	$500 Ladies' Seven Card Stud	141	Donna Ward (1/1)	$28,200	Toni Brown	Results
4	April 29, 1991	$1,500 Pot Limit Omaha	128	An Tran (1/1)	$87,600	Chris Björin	Results
5	April 30, 1991	$2,500 Limit Hold'em	202	Ron Stanley (1/1)	$203,000	Stavros Karabinas	Results
6	May 1, 1991	$5,000 No Limit 2–7 Draw Lowball	26	John Spadavecchia (1/1)	$58,500	Dewey Tomko (0/3)	Results
7	May 2, 1991	$2,500 Seven Card Stud	133	Rodney H. Pardey (1/1)	$133,000	Don Williams (0/3)	Results
8	May 3, 1991	$1,500 Limit Hold'em	427	Max Linder (1/1)	$256,000	Eddie Schwettman	Results
9	May 4, 1991	$1,500 Limit Omaha	154	Paul Heinrich (1/1)	$92,000	Chris Hatzakos	Results
10	May 5, 1991	$5,000 Pot Limit Omaha	63	Jay Heimowitz (1/3)	$126,000	John Bonetti (0/1)	Results
11	May 6, 1991	$1,500 Seven Card Stud Hi-Lo Split	177	Mike Hart (1/3)	$106,200	James Richburg	Results
12	May 7, 1991	$1,500 Ace to Five Draw	178	Pat Flanagan (1/1)	$106,800	David Allred	Results
13	May 8, 1991	$1,500 Seven Card Stud	245	Artie Cobb (1/3)	$146,400	John Sears	Results
14	May 9, 1991	$5,000 Seven Card Stud	71	Thomas Chung (1/2)	$142,000	Mim Penney	Results
15	May 10, 1991	$1,500 No Limit Hold'em	271	Brent Carter (1/1)	$166,800	O'Neil Longson	Results
16	May 11, 1991	$2,500 No Limit Hold'em	208	Doyle Brunson (1/7)	$208,000	Dan Stashkiw	Results
17	May 12, 1991	$1,500 Omaha Hi-Lo Split	198	Joe Becker (1/1)	$119,400	Mel Judah (0/1)	Results
18	May 13, 1991	$10,000 No Limit Hold'em Main Event	215	Brad Daugherty (1/1)	$1,000,000	Don Holt (0/1)	Results

== Main Event ==
There were 215 entrants to the main event. Each paid $10,000 to enter the tournament, with the top 36 players finishing in the money. This was the first Main Event to offer a top prize of $1,000,000.

=== Final table ===
Place	Name	Prize
1st	Brad Daugherty	$1,000,000
2nd	Don Holt	$402,500
3rd	Bob Veltri	$201,250
4th	Don Williams	$115,000
5th	Perry Green	$69,000
6th	Ali Farsai	$34,500

=== In The Money Finishes ===
NB: This list is restricted to In The Money finishers with an existing Wikipedia entry.

Place	Name	Prize
7th	Hilbert Shirey	$28,750
9th	Donnacha O'Dea	$17,250
10th	Robert Turner	$11,500
11th	Jay Heimowitz	$11,500
12th	O'Neil Longson	$11,500
13th	Gabe Kaplan	$11,500
15th	Brent Carter	$11,500
18th	David Baxter	$11,500
19th	Hans Lund	$9,200
21st	Jason Lester	$9,200
22nd	Mike Hart	$9,200
24th	Mike Sexton	$9,200
29th	Bobby Baldwin	$8,050
34th	Hamid Dastmalchi	$8,050
