= John Strzemp =

American casino executive and poker player (1951–2025)

John Strzemp, II
- Born: November 3, 1951; Chicago, Illinois, U.S.
- Died: April 15, 2025 (aged 73)

World Series of Poker
- Bracelet: None
- Money finishes: 10
- Highest WSOP Main Event finish: 2nd, 1997

World Poker Tour
- Title: None
- Final table: None
- Money finishes: 2

John Strzemp, II (November 3, 1951 – April 15, 2025) was an American casino executive and poker player based in Las Vegas Valley, Nevada. He was the Executive Vice President and Chief Administrative Officer of Wynn Resorts. He was previously an executive with other casinos in Las Vegas, including the Mirage Casino.

As a tournament poker player, Strzemp's best showing was as the runner-up to Stu Ungar at the 1997 World Series of Poker Main Event. As the final hand was unfolding, tournament commentator Gabe Kaplan had dubbed him the "Treasure of the Sierra Madre". Strzemp began the final hand with the best hand, A8 to Ungar's A4. He led until a deuce on the river made a wheel for Ungar, giving Stu the victory and his third world championship. Strzemp won $583,000 for his second-place finish. In addition to Ungar, this final table also featured WSOP bracelet winners Ron Stanley and Mel Judah.

Strzemp continued to play in tournaments, and had a total of ten cashes in the World Series of Poker. He cashed in the 2007 WSOP Main Event, finishing 379th (out of over 6,000 players), winning $34,644. His most recent WSOP cash was in 2009 in the $5,000 No Limit Hold'em event. He also cashed two times in the World Poker Tour, first in 2004 in the Party Poker Million Cruise event, and in 2008 in the $25,000 WPT Championship event. As of 2009, Strzemp's tournament winnings had exceeded $900,000.

His son, John Strzemp, III, is also a poker player and made his first cash in the 2008 WSOP, finishing in 3rd place in the $1,500 No Limit Hold'em Shootout event.

Strzemp was born in Chicago on November 3, 1951. He died after a long illness on April 15, 2025, at the age of 73.
