= 1994 World Series of Poker =

Series of poker tournaments

- Location: Binion's Horseshoe, Las Vegas, Nevada
- Dates: April 16 – May 6

Champion
- (United States) Russ Hamilton

The 1994 World Series of Poker (WSOP) was a series of poker tournaments held at Binion's Horseshoe.

== Events ==
There were 20 preliminary events at the 1994 World Series of Poker.

#	Date	Event	Entries	Winner	Prize	Runner-up	Results
1	April 16, 1994	$1,500 Limit Hold'em	506	Steven Sim (1/1)	$289,200	Charles Brock	Results
2	April 17, 1994	$5,000 Limit Hold'em	105	Erik Seidel (1/3)	$210,000	Michael Davis	Results
3	April 18, 1994	$2,500 Pot Limit Omaha w/Rebuys	167	Huck Seed (1/1)	$167,000	Lindy Chambers	Results
4	April 19, 1994	$1,500 No Limit Hold'em	330	George Rodis (1/1)	$135,000	Phil Hellmuth (0/5)	Results
5	April 20, 1994	$2,500 Omaha Hi-Lo Split	103	J. C. Pearson (1/1)	$103,000	Matthias Rohnacher	Results
6	April 21, 1994	$2,500 Seven Card Stud	132	Rodney H. Pardey (1/2)	$132,000	Alan Boston	Results
7	April 22, 1994	$5,000 Seven Card Stud	72	Roger Moore (1/1)	$144,000	Adam Roberts	Results
8	April 23, 1994	$1,500 Pot Limit Omaha	168	O'Neil Longson (1/1)	$100,800	J. C. Pearson	Results
9	April 24, 1994	$2,500 Limit Hold'em	212	Mike Laing (1/1)	$212,000	Fred Lieberman	Results
10	April 25, 1994	$1,500 Pot Limit Hold'em	247	Jay Heimowitz (1/4)	$148,200	Quinton Nixon	Results
11	April 26, 1994	$2,500 No Limit Hold'em	220	John Heaney (1/1)	$220,000	Hal Kant (0/1)	Results
12	April 27, 1994	$1,500 Razz	148	Mike Hart (1/4)	$88,800	Tommy Hufnagle	Results
13	April 28, 1994	$1,000 Ladies' Seven Card Stud	96	Barbara Enright (1/2)	$38,400	Natalie Ryke	Results
14	April 29, 1994	$1,500 Omaha Hi-Lo Split	225	T. J. Cloutier (1/2)	$135,000	Chris Bjorin	Results
15	April 30, 1994	$2,500 Pot Limit Hold'em	163	T. J. Cloutier (2/3)	$163,000	Travis Dang	Results
16	May 1, 1994	$1,500 Ace to Five Draw	155	J. J. Chun (1/1)	$93,000	Steve Flicker	Results
17	May 2, 1994	$1,500 Seven Card Stud	226	Johnny Chan (1/4)	$135,600	Mansour Matloubi (0/1)	Results
18	May 3, 1994	$1,500 Limit Omaha	139	Brent Carter (1/2)	$83,400	Moxie Ungar	Results
19	May 4, 1994	$1,500 Seven Card Stud Hi-Lo Split	212	Vince Burgio (1/1)	$127,200	Gary Hutzler	Results
20	May 5, 1994	$5,000 No Limit Deuce to Seven Draw w/Rebuys	57	Lyle Berman (1/3)	$128,250	Huck Seed	Results
21	May 6, 1994	$10,000 No Limit Hold'em Main Event	268	Russ Hamilton (1/1)	$1,000,000	Hugh Vincent	Results

== Main Event ==
There were 268 entrants to the main event. Each paid $10,000 to enter the tournament, with the top 27 players finishing in the money. Since this was the 25th anniversary of the Main Event, the winner received $1,000,000, plus his/her weight in silver, in celebration of the WSOP's silver anniversary.

=== Final table ===
Place	Name	Prize
1st	Russ Hamilton	$1,000,000*
2nd	Hugh Vincent	$588,000
3rd	John Spadavecchia	$294,000
4th	Vince Burgio	$168,000
5th	Al Krux	$100,800
6th	Robert Turner	$50,400

* Hamilton also won his weight in silver

=== In The Money Finishes ===
NB: This list is restricted to In The Money finishers with an existing Wikipedia entry.

Place	Name	Prize
16th	Mansour Matloubi	$20,160
19th	J. C. Pearson	$16,800
22nd	Howard Goldfarb	$16,800
24th	Bobby Baldwin	$16,800
25th	Yoshio Nakano	$16,800
26th	Annie Duke	$16,800
27th	Donnacha O'Dea	$16,800
