= Susan Isaacs (disambiguation) =

Susan Isaacs is a novelist, essayist and screenwriter.

Susie or Susan Isaacs may also refer to:

- Susan Sutherland Isaacs (1885–1948), educational psychologist and psychoanalyst
- Susie Isaacs (born 1946), professional poker player
