= Jim Fenwick =

Australian photojournalist (1934–2021)

- Born: James Fenwick; 11 October 1934; Brisbane, Queensland
- Died: 16 November 2021 (aged 87); Redcliffe, Queensland
- Occupation: Photojournalist
- Relatives: Marsha Waggoner (sister) Billie Fenwick Kruithof (sister)

Jim Fenwick (11 October 1934 – 16 November 2021) was an Australian photojournalist. He is best known as the chief photographer for The Courier Mail from 1974 to 1994, and winner of the 1965 Walkley Award for Best News Picture.

== Photographic career ==
Fenwick was born in Brisbane, Queensland in 1934 and moved to Margate in 1942, where he attended Humpybong State School from 1942 to 1948.

Fenwick began his photographic career at the age of 16 as a cadet at The Courier Mail, eventually rising to become that newspaper's chief photographer in 1974, a position which he held until his retirement in 1994. He was also their pictorial editor for eight years (1984–1991). As a representative of News Limited newspapers, Fenwick covered the 1982 Commonwealth Games in Brisbane, the 1988 Olympic Games in Seoul, and the 1990 Commonwealth Games in Auckland, and subsequently also became a war correspondent with the Australian Army in Somalia in 1992. He also contributed the foreword for the 1990 book Brisbane, Our Town – A Century of Photographs by Helen Dash.

In 2006 and 2007, Fenwick was chosen to judge the Australian Council for Agricultural Journalists' Australian Star Prize for Rural Photography. Also in 2007, the Redcliffe Museum presented a retrospective exhibition of his photos, the first time his work has been exhibited as a complete collection.

== Awards ==
Fenwick won many awards during his career, including the prestigious Walkley Award for Best News Picture in 1965, for his images of the vessel Kaptajn Nielsen as it lay capsized in Moreton Bay in September 1964. He was also awarded Australian Photographer of the Year (1980), Nikon's International Best Series of Pictures, and the International Sports Press Association's World's Best Black and White Picture (1977). In addition, Fenwick received a special Walkley Award in 1994 in honour of his years of service to Australian photojournalism.

== Personal life ==
In 1957, Fenwick married June Enchelmaier; together they had three children. Jim was the brother of noted professional poker player Marsha Waggoner.
