= Tony Ma =

Vietnamese-born American poker player

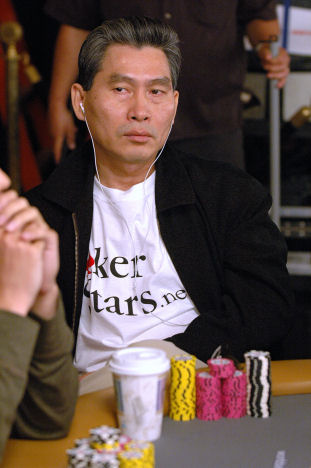
- Ma at the 2006 World Series of Poker
- Nickname: The Animal
- Born: Hieu Ngoc Ma c. 1957 (age 68–69); Vietnam

World Series of Poker
- Bracelets: 2
- Money finishes: 22
- Highest WSOP Main Event finish: 526th, 2013

World Poker Tour
- Final table: 1
- Money finishes: 8

Tony Ma (born c. 1957 in Vietnam) is an American professional poker player.

Born Hieu Ngoc Ma, an ethnic Hoa, he moved to Southern California in 1985 and became a regular fixture on the poker circuit.

== Poker career ==
At the 1996 World Series of Poker, he collected a bracelet and $236,000 for winning the $5,000 limit hold'em event. He won a second bracelet in 2000 for the $2,000 limit hold'em event.

In 1999, Ma won Card Players' Player of the Year Award.

Ma made the final table of the World Poker Tour Season 1 Pro-Celebrity Invitational Tournament, finishing in 5th place.

As of 2009, his total live tournament winnings exceed $4,100,000. His 22 cashes at the WSOP account for $1,157,987 of those winnings.

Ma now resides in South El Monte with his wife and two children.

=== World Series of Poker bracelets ===
Year	Tournament	Prize (US$)
1996	$5,000 Limit Hold'em	$236,000
2000	$2,000 Limit Hold'em	$367,040
