= Paul Clark (poker player) =

American poker player (1947–2015)

Robert Paul Clark
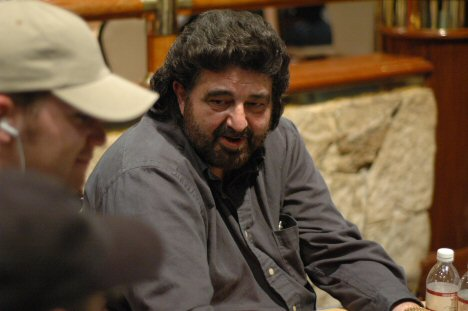
- Clark at the 2005 World Poker Tour Mirage Poker Showdown
- Nickname: Eskimo
- Born: June 2, 1947; Stockton, Missouri, US
- Died: April 15, 2015 (aged 67)

World Series of Poker
- Bracelets: 3
- Money finishes: 20
- Highest WSOP Main Event finish: 19th, 1997

World Poker Tour
- Title: None
- Final table: 1
- Money finishes: 5

Robert Paul "Eskimo" Clark (June 2, 1947, in Stockton, Missouri – April 15, 2015, in Las Vegas, Nevada) was an American professional poker player who lived in Las Vegas, Nevada.

== Life and career ==
Robert Paul Clark grew up in Stockton, Missouri, one of seven brothers and sisters.

Before turning to poker, Eskimo Clark was a veteran of the Vietnam War, where he worked as a dental assistant.

Clark first finished in the money at the World Series of Poker (WSOP) in the 1988 limit Omaha event.

He has also made money finishes in the $10,000 No Limit Hold 'em Main Event in 1997 (19th) and 1998 (25th), where he was eliminated with pocket aces.

In 2003, Clark won the $1,500 No Limit Hold 'em event of the Bellagio's Five Diamond World Poker Classic, earning a $160,095 prize by defeating a final table including Erik Seidel, Chris Karagulleyan, Dave "Devilfish" Ulliott, Johnny Chan and Huck Seed.

Clark began playing the World Poker Tour (WPT) during its second season. His second-place finish in the World Poker Challenge $5,000 No Limit Hold 'em event earned him $310,403.

Clark's last cash at the World Series of Poker was in 2007.

His total career winnings exceeded $2,700,000. His 20 cashes at the WSOP account for $632,005 of those winnings.

Outside of poker, Clark's hobbies included baseball.

He died on April 15, 2015, in Las Vegas, Nevada, at age 67.

== World Series of Poker bracelets ==
Year	Tournament	Prize (US$)
1992	$5,000 Seven Card Stud	$122,000
1999	$1,500 Razz	$84,610
2002	$1,500 Seven Card Stud Hi/Lo	$125,200
