= Lee Salem (poker player) =

American poker player

World Series of Poker
- Bracelet: None
- Money finishes: 7
- Highest WSOP Main Event finish: 5th, 1998

World Poker Tour
- Title: None
- Final table: 1
- Money finishes: 3

Lee Salem is an American poker player from Carlsbad, California. He has made several notable cashes in World Series of Poker and World Poker Tour tournaments and is also a cash game player.

Salem finished in 5th place in the 1998 World Series of Poker Main Event. He won $190,000 for this finish, which is his largest tournament cash to date. The main event final table for that year included top professional players T. J. Cloutier who finished third and Scotty Nguyen who went on to win the championship and become one of the best known and popular players in the poker world.

Salem first cashed in the WSOP in 1995 in a limit hold'em event and has a total of seven cashes in the World Series of Poker so far in his career. He also cashed in the WSOP Main Event in 2000 (40th place) and in 2005 (361st place).

He also has cashed in the World Poker Tour three times, including making one final table. Salem made the final table of the Grand Prix de Paris 2003 event during the second season of the WPT. He finished in 6th place in that tournament which was won by David Benyamine.

Salem won a limit hold'em event at the California State Poker Championship in 2003, earning $124,655 for the win. He is also a cash game player in and around his hometown in California.

As of 2025, Salem's total tournament winnings exceed $1,000,000. His seven cashes at the World Series of Poker make up $291,198 of that total.
