= 1990 World Series of Poker =

Series of poker tournaments

- Location: Binion's Horseshoe, Las Vegas, Nevada
- Dates: April 30 – May 14

Champion
- (Iran) Mansour Matloubi

The 1990 World Series of Poker (WSOP) was a series of poker tournaments held at Binion's Horseshoe.

== Events ==
There were 14 preliminary events at the 1990 World Series of Poker. Amarillo Slim became the first player to win WSOP bracelets in three different decades.

#	Date	Event	Entries	Winner	Prize	Runner-up	Results
1	April 30, 1990	$1,500 Limit Hold'em	420	Mike Hart (1/2)	$252,000	Mel Judah (0/1)	Results
2	May 1, 1990	$1,500 Razz	186	Ray Rumler (1/1)	$111,600	Robert Turner	Results
3	May 2, 1990	$1,500 Seven Card Stud Hi-Lo Split	181	Norm Boulus (1/1)	$108,600	Wally Caldwell	Results
4	May 3, 1990	$1,500 Omaha Hi-Lo Split	189	Monte Kouz (1/1)	$113,400	Herb Chessler	Results
5	May 4, 1990	$1,500 Limit Omaha	178	Tony Stormsand (1/1)	$106,800	Jack Green	Results
6	May 5, 1990	$1,500 Ace to Five Draw	207	Phil Reher (1/1)	$124,200	Al Kudelka	Results
7	May 6, 1990	$1,500 Seven Card Stud	264	Vasilis Lazarou (1/1)	$158,400	Steve Metz	Results
8	May 7, 1990	$1,500 Pot Limit Omaha	189	Shawqui Shunnarah (1/1)	$113,400	Austin Scott	Results
9	May 8, 1990	$5,000 No Limit Deuce to Seven Draw	37	John Bonetti (1/1)	$83,250	Milton Butts	Results
10	May 9, 1990	$5,000 Seven Card Stud	84	Hugh Todd (1/1)	$168,000	Keith Sexton	Results
11	May 10, 1990	$5,000 Pot Limit Omaha	71	Amarillo Slim (1/4)	$142,000	O'Neil Longson	Results
12	May 11, 1990	$2,500 Limit Hold'em	254	Berry Johnston (1/3)	$254,000	Hal Kant (0/1)	Results
13	May 12, 1990	$2,500 No Limit Hold'em	260	Allen Baker (1/1)	$280,000	Freddy Deeb	Results
14	May 13, 1990	$500 Ladies' Seven Card Stud	110	Marie Gabert (1/1)	$22,000	Jenny Kaye	Results
15	May 14, 1990	$10,000 No Limit Hold'em Main Event	194	Mansour Matloubi (1/1)	$835,000	Hans Lund (0/1)	Results

== Main Event ==
There were 194 entrants to the main event. Each paid $10,000 to enter the tournament, with the top 36 players finishing in the money. For the first time since the 1984 WSOP Main Event, the final table had nine players. On the third day of the tournament, Stu Ungar was found unconscious on the floor of his hotel room from a drug overdose. However, he had such a chip lead that even when the dealers kept taking his blinds out every orbit, Ungar still made the final table and finished ninth pocketing $25,050. Berry Johnston entered the final table in pursuit of second Main Event title, but finished in fifth.

=== Final table ===
Place	Name	Prize
1st	Mansour Matloubi	$835,000
2nd	Hans Lund	$334,000
3rd	Dave Crunkleton	$167,000
4th	Jim Ward	$91,850
5th	Berry Johnston	$75,150
6th	Al Krux	$58,450
7th	Rod Peate	$50,100
8th	John Bonetti	$33,400
9th	Stu Ungar	$25,050

=== In The Money Finishes ===
NB: This list is restricted to In The Money finishers with an existing Wikipedia entry.

Place	Name	Prize
13th	Bobby Hoff	$12,500
17th	Mel Judah	$12,500
19th	Perry Green	$10,000
20th	Mickey Appleman	$10,000
24th	Tom Franklin	$10,000
26th	Humberto Brenes	$8,050
28th	Artie Cobb	$7,500
32nd	Donnacha O'Dea	$7,500
34th	Thor Hansen	$7,500
35th	Hoyt Corkins	$7,500
