= O'Neil Longson =

American poker player

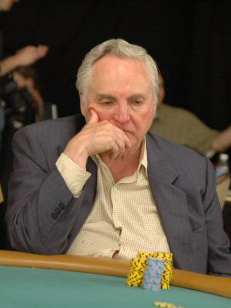
- Longson in the 2005 World Series of Poker
- Nickname: OILEEN

World Series of Poker
- Bracelets: 3
- Money finishes: 26
- Highest WSOP Main Event finish: 12th, 1991

O'Neil Longson is an American professional poker player from Las Vegas, Nevada, who has won three bracelets at the World Series of Poker.

== Poker career ==
Longson first finished in the money at the World Series of Poker (WSOP) in 1980, finishing 4th in the $1,000 No Limit Hold'em event. In 1990 in the $5,000 Pot limit Omaha event, he finished 2nd to former world champion Amarillo Slim.

He had another second-place finish in the 1991 in the $1,500 no limit hold'em event, where he finished 2nd to Brent Carter. He also cashed in the $10,000 no limit hold'em Main Event that year, finishing 12th. Longson was again close to winning a WSOP bracelet in 1992, finishing 2nd to Hoyt Corkins in the $5,000 pot limit Omaha event.

Longson eventually won a WSOP bracelet in 1994 World Series of Poker in the $1,500 pot limit Omaha event, defeating a final table including Surinder Sunar and T. J. Cloutier. He defeated J. C. Pearson during the heads-up play.

He won a second bracelet in 2003 in the $5,000 no limit deuce to seven draw event, defeating a final table including runner-up Allen Cunningham, Bill Baxter, Chris Ferguson and Howard Lederer.

His third and most recent bracelet came in the 2005 $1,500 Seven-Card Razz event, defeating a final table including runner-up Bruno Fitoussi, Archie Karas, and Mickey Wernick.

As of 2026, his total live tournament winnings were $2,187,021. His 26 cashes at the WSOP account for $994,195 of those winnings.

Longson plays fewer tournaments than he used to as he is hard of hearing and now chooses to concentrate on cash games instead. His overwhelmingly aggressive style was noted in "Pot-Limit & No-Limit Poker" by Stewart Reuben and Bob Ciaffone.

== World Series of Poker Bracelets ==
Year	Tournament	Prize (US$)
1994	$1,500 Pot-Limit Omaha	$100,800
2003	$5,000 No-Limit Deuce-to-Seven Draw	$147,680
2005	$1,500 Razz	$125,690
