= Billy Argyros =

Greek poker player

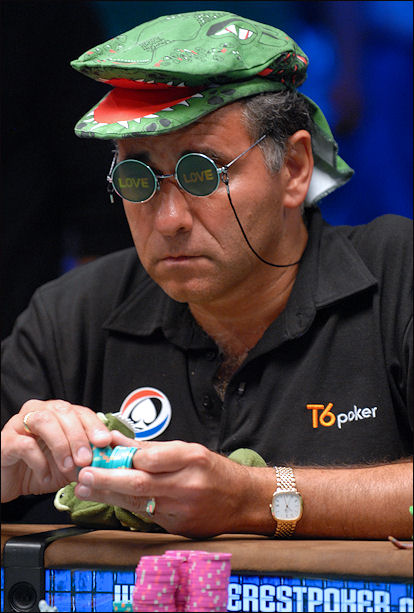
- Billy Argyros at the 2008 World Series of Poker
- Nickname: The Croc

World Series of Poker
- Bracelet: None
- Money finishes: 6
- Highest WSOP Main Event finish: 15th, 1995

World Poker Tour
- Title: None
- Final table: None
- Money finish: 1

Billy Argyros, commonly referred to as Billy the Croc or The Croc, is a Greek Australian Gambler & Australian Poker Hall of Fame Member.

The Croc as is a well known poker player on the Australian circuit, with his interest in the game of poker first developed when he lost all his money at a poker game that a friend had hosted. He studied poker strategy and his game improved dramatically afterwards. He began using his new-found knowledge of the game at low-stakes poker tables, but he quickly learned and moved up to the high-stakes poker games in different local casinos in his region.

In 1995, Argyros cashed in the money in the $10,000 No Limit Hold'em Main Event, finishing 15th of a field of 273 players, winning $24,220. He has cashed on the World Poker Tour.

He appeared on the former television show Australian Celebrity Poker Challenge as the resident expert, during which players may call 'The Croc' to provide advice once during the game.

Argyros received his nickname 'The Croc' while playing against Johnny Moss in a satellite event for the World Series of Poker. He introduced himself as 'Crocodile Billy', copied from the movie "Crocodile" Dundee, which was popular at the time.

As of 2020, Argyros' total recorded live tournament winnings are closing in on $2,000,000.
