= 1998 World Series of Poker =

Series of poker tournaments

- Location: Binion's Horseshoe, Las Vegas, Nevada
- Dates: April 21 – May 15

Champion
- (Vietnam) Scotty Nguyen

The 1998 World Series of Poker (WSOP) was a series of poker tournaments held at Binion's Horseshoe.

== Events ==
There were 20 preliminary bracelet events at the 1998 World Series of Poker. Doyle Brunson became the second player in WSOP history and the first player since the 1981 WSOP to win eight career bracelets.

#	Date	Event	Entries	Winner	Prize	Runner-up	Results
1	April 21, 1998	$2,000 Limit Hold'em	581	Farzad Bonyadi (1/1)	$429,940	Paul Scarim	Results
2	April 22, 1998	$1,500 Razz	155	Doyle Brunson (1/8)	$93,000	Ray Dehkharghani	Results
3	April 23, 1998	$1,500 Limit Omaha	183	Michael Shadkin (1/1)	$109,800	Jan Lundberg	Results
4	April 24, 1998	$1,500 Seven Card Stud	267	Kirk Morrison (1/1)	$148,185	Max Stern (0/3)	Results
5	April 25, 1998	$1,500 Pot Limit Omaha w/Rebuys	183	Donnacha O'Dea (1/1)	$154,800	Johnny Chan (0/5)	Results
6	April 26, 1998	$1,500 Seven Card Stud Split	251	Tommy Hufnagle (1/1)	$139,305	Don Holt (0/1)	Results
7	April 27, 1998	$2,000 No Limit Hold'em	350	Jeff Ross (1/1)	$259,000	Layne Flack	Results
8	April 28, 1998	$2,000 Omaha Hi-Lo Split	204	Chau Giang (1/2)	$150,960	Carl Bailey	Results
9	April 29, 1998	$2,000 Pot Limit Hold'em	229	Daniel Negreanu (1/1)	$169,460	Dominic Bourke	Results
10	April 30, 1998	$2,500 Seven Card Stud	152	Artie Cobb (1/4)	$152,000	Helmut Koch	Results
11	May 1, 1998	$2,500 Pot Limit Omaha w/Rebuys	82	T. J. Cloutier (1/4)	$136,000	Doyle Brunson (0/8)	Results
12	May 2, 1998	$2,500 Seven Card Stud Hi-Lo Split	120	Bill Gempel (1/1)	$120,000	Hershey Entin	Results
13	May 3, 1998	$3,000 Limit Hold'em	171	David Chiu (1/2)	$205,200	Mickey Seagle	Results
14	May 4, 1998	$3,000 Omaha Hi-Lo Split	111	Paul Rowe (1/1)	$133,200	James Van Alstyne	Results
15	May 5, 1998	$3,000 Pot Limit Hold'em	172	Steve Rydel (1/1)	$206,400	Dave Ulliott (0/1)	Results
16	May 6, 1998	$5,000 No Limit Deuce to Seven Draw w/Rebuys	26	Erik Seidel (1/4)	$132,750	Lamar Wilkinson	Results
17	May 7, 1998	$3,000 No Limit Hold'em	242	Ken Buntjer (1/1)	$268,620	Gorden Hall	Results
18	May 8, 1998	$5,000 Seven Card Stud	104	Jan Chen (1/1)	$208,000	Don Barton	Results
19	May 9, 1998	$5,000 Limit Hold'em	112	Patrick Bruel (1/1)	$224,000	Robert Redman	Results
20	May 10, 1998	$1,000 Ladies' Seven Card Stud	100	Mandy Commanda (1/1)	$40,000	Jerri Thomas	Results
21	May 11, 1998	$10,000 No Limit Hold'em Main Event	350	Scotty Nguyen (1/2)	$1,000,000	Kevin McBride	Results

== Main Event ==
There were 350 entrants to the main event. Each paid $10,000 to enter the tournament, with the top 27 players finishing in the money. The 1998 Main Event was notable for having only five players reach the official final table for the first time in WSOP Main Event history. On the final hand of the Main Event, a full house was dealt on the table (8♣ 9♦ 9♥ 8♥ 8♠). Nguyen memorably said to his opponent Kevin McBride: "You call, it's gonna be all over baby!" Previously in the game, with McBride all-in, Nguyen had quipped "It's gonna be all over if I read you right" before calling. However Nguyen's read hadn't been correct and McBride had won the pot, bringing him back in the game. This time, McBride called and went all-in, saying "I call. I play the board." Nguyen beat McBride with a better full house by holding J♦ 9♣.

=== Final table ===
Name	Number of chips (percentage of total)	WSOP Bracelets*	WSOP Cashes*	WSOP Earnings*
(Vietnam) Scotty Nguyen	1,184,000 (33.8%)	1	7	$244,462
(United States) Kevin McBride	873,000 (24.9%)	0	1	$25,200
(United States) T.J. Cloutier	829,000 (23.7%)	4	27	$1,255,886
(United States) Dewey Weum	376,000 (10.7%)	0	9	$135,267
(United States) Lee Salem	240,000 (6.9%)	0	2	$23,223

*Career statistics prior to the beginning of the 1998 Main Event.

=== Final table results ===
Place	Name	Prize
1st	Scotty Nguyen	$1,000,000
2nd	Kevin McBride	$687,500
3rd	T. J. Cloutier	$437,500
4th	Dewey Weum	$250,000
5th	Lee Salem	$190,000

=== In The Money Finishes ===
NB: This list is restricted to In The Money finishers with an existing Wikipedia entry.

Place	Name	Prize
6th	Ben Roberts	$150,000
9th	Paul McKinney	$57,500
10th	Susie Isaacs	$40,000
12th	Bobby Hoff	$40,000
17th	Kathy Liebert	$30,000
20th	Vince Burgio	$25,000
21st	Thor Hansen	$25,000
22nd	Jack Keller	$25,000
23rd	Rod Peate	$25,000
25th	Paul Clark	$25,000
27th	Farzad Bonyadi	$25,000
