= Bambi Francisco =

American journalist, author, and businesswoman

Bambi Francisco Roizen
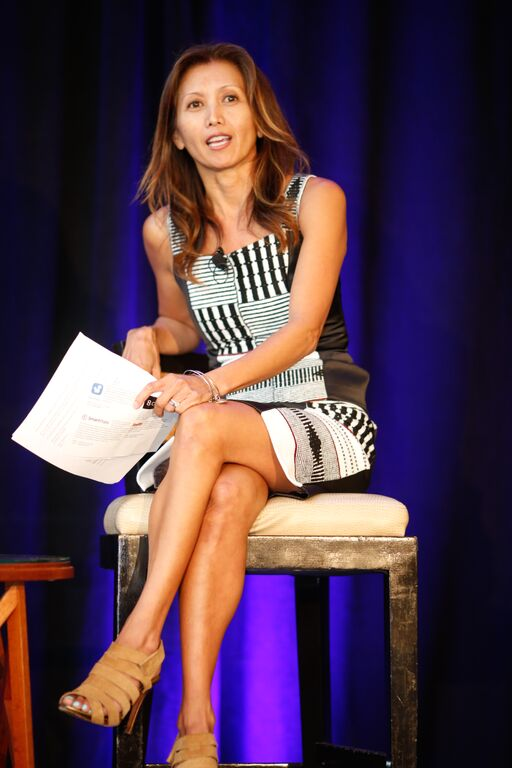
- Born: December 1966 (age 59); Cebu City, Philippines
- Occupations: Journalist, Columnist, CEO
- Notable credits: CBS MarketWatch lead reporter, Internet (1999–2007); CNNfn producer, reporter (1996–1999); KPIX reporter, Technology (1999–2003)
- Title: CEO, Vator
- Website: http://www.vator.tv/

Bambi Francisco is a Filipino-American journalist, author, and businesswoman. She is the founder and CEO of Vator, a news website and social network dedicated to high-tech entrepreneurs and investors.

== Career ==
Francisco is a former syndicated columnist and correspondent for Dow Jones MarketWatch. She covered Internet trends and investments across the public and private sectors. Her newsletter reached more than 400,000 subscribers. She started her career at MarketWatch in 1999 as Internet editor and morning business anchor for KPIX, a CBS affiliate - at the time, MarketWatch was owned by CBS.

In 2001, Bambi was named to the "blue-chip" financial reporting all-star team by The Journal of Financial Reporters, the leading organization for the business news industry. Adweek named her one of the top ten most influential journalists on the Web.

When Spike TV launched in 2003 as the "first network for men", Bambi Francisco anchored daily business news reports on the current state of world markets and finance as host of "CBS MarketWatch" on Spike TV.

Among the articles she wrote at MarketWatch was a diary-like account of her three-week trek to Nepal. In it she made a quick allusion to how hiking in the Himalayas was similar to watching the rise and fall of the Internet bubble.

She left MarketWatch in April 2007 to manage her internet startup, Vator, full-time. Concerns were expressed by management regarding conflicts of interest concerning her ownership of the venture during her employment at MarketWatch. Before Vator even launched, Francisco's project received a tremendous amount of press from the front page of the Wall Street Journal, to television media conglomerates, such as the BBC, to respected tech magazines, such as Wired.

Francisco is a frequent speaker on innovation and entrepreneurship. In the spring of 2014, she gave a talk in Las Vegas about what kind of foundation is needed for tech hubs to flourish. She has also become a leading proponent of bringing more tech opportunities to emerging areas, such as Oakland. She has also been credited for helping to boost Oakland's tech image.

== Personal life ==
Bambi's father is Noli Francisco, a Filipino American poker player and entrepreneur.

Bambi and her family live in the San Francisco Bay Area.

== Published books ==
Francisco's book Unequally Yoked, was released in September 2020. The book explores what she claims is the false narrative that America is systemically racist. Peter Thiel said this about the book: "Don’t treat this as a political book. It is a work of intelligence: Bambi has lived behind enemy lines of both factions in the American culture war; and both would do well to learn from her reporting and analysis.”
