= Buddy Bonnecaze =

American poker player

World Series of Poker
- Bracelets: 2
- Money finishes: 6
- Highest WSOP Main Event finish: 35th, 1986

Buddy Bonnecaze is an American poker player, winner of two World Series of Poker bracelets in the 1990s. Bonnecaze was a prominent player in the 1980s and 1990s.

Bonnecaze began cashing in poker tournaments in the mid-1980s and made his first cash in the World Series of Poker in 1986, finishing in 35th place in the Main Event, winning $7,500.

He won his first WSOP bracelet in 1992 in the $1,500 Pot Limit Hold'em event. The next year, Bonnecaze won another bracelet, this time in the $1,500 Pot Limit Omaha event.

After nearly a decade away from the poker scene, Bonnecaze returned to tournaments and came close to winning the Winter Bayou Poker Challenge $300 No Limit Hold'em tournament in New Orleans in 2009, finishing in 4th place and earning a $4,609 pay day.

As of 2009, Bonnecaze has tournament winnings of $234,064, with $205,465 of those winnings from the WSOP.

== World Series of Poker Bracelets ==
Year	Tournament	Prize (US$)
1992	$1,500 Pot Limit Hold'em	$115,800
1993	$1,500 Pot Limit Omaha	$83,400
