= Valter Farina =

Italian poker player (1954–2026)

Valter Farina (1954 – 15 March 2026) was an Italian poker player.

== Life and career ==
Farina was born in Genoa in 1954. He was one of the Italian poker pioneers, a professional in the various specialities for over 35 years. He was the first Italian in history to have won a World Series of Poker bracelet: on 26 April 1995, he won the $1,500 Limit Seven Card Stud event (event #2 of the WSOP 1995).

In his career, he collected a total of seven prize placements at the WSOP: three in the Pot Limit Omaha, three in the Seven Card Stud, one in the No Limit Hold'em. The last ITM was at the 2009 WSOP.

From the early 1990s, he lived permanently in Las Vegas, where he also frequently played at cash game tables.

Farina died in Sint Maarten on 15 March 2026, at the age of 72.
