= Farzad Bonyadi =

Iranian poker player

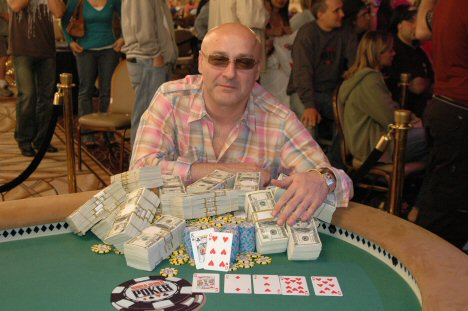
- Bonyadi at the 2005 World Series of Poker
- Nickname: Freddie
- Born: c. 1959 (age 66–67); Tehran, Iran

World Series of Poker
- Bracelets: 4
- Money finishes: 31
- Highest WSOP Main Event finish: 27th, 1998

World Poker Tour
- Title: None
- Final tables: 2
- Money finishes: 15

Farzad "Freddy" Bonyadi (born c. 1959) is an Iranian professional poker player based in Aliso Viejo, California, who has won four World Series of Poker bracelets.

Bonyadi moved from Iran to America in 1983, where he worked as an executive host in the LA Commerce Casino and as a shift manager at Hollywood Park Casino.

Bonyadi first major tournament success came when he won the $2,000 limit hold'em event at the 1998 World Series of Poker (WSOP), defeating a final table that included Mimi Tran and John Cernuto on the way to a $429,940 first prize. In the same WSOP, he also made the final table of the $1,500 seven card stud split event, and placed in the money in the $10,000 no limit hold'em main event.

Bonyadi made a final table in the Season 2 World Poker Tour (WPT) Legends of Poker event, where he finished 5th at a final table featuring Mel Judah, Paul Phillips, T. J. Cloutier, Chip Jett and Phil Laak. Bonyadi made a second WPT final table when he finished runner-up to Scott Seiver in the Season 9 WPT Championship, netting $1,069,900.

At the 2018 WSOP, Bonyadi's mother, Farhintaj Bonyadi, won the $1,000 Super Seniors No Limit Hold'em event, making them the first mother/son World Series of Poker bracelet winners.

As of 2023, his total live tournament winnings exceed $4,600,000. His 31 cashes at the WSOP account for over $2,200,000 of those winnings.

== World Series of Poker Bracelets ==
Year	Tournament	Prize (US$)
1998	$2,000 Limit Hold'em	$429,940
2004	$1,000 Deuce to Seven Triple Draw	$86,980
2005	$2,500 No Limit Hold'em	$594,960
2021	$10,000 No Limit Deuce to Seven Single Draw	$297,051
