= John Spadavecchia =

American poker player (1938–2023)

World Series of Poker
- Bracelet: 1
- Money finishes: 26
- Highest WSOP Main Event finish: 3rd, 1994

World Poker Tour
- Title: None
- Final table: 1
- Money finishes: 4

European Poker Tour
- Title: None
- Final table: None
- Money finishes: 2

John Spadavecchia (July 17, 1938 – June 10, 2023) was an American professional poker player from Lighthouse Point, Florida.

Spadavecchia was a regular on the poker tournament circuit since the 1980s, with his first finish in the money of a World Series of Poker (WSOP) event coming in the 1988 World Series of Poker in the $10,000 no limit Texas hold 'em main event where he finished 28th, earning him $8,750.

== World Series of Poker bracelets ==
Year	Tournament	Prize (US$)
1991	$5,000 Deuce to Seven Draw	$58,500

== Poker career ==
Spadavecchia cashed in a total of three World Series of Poker main events, the first coming in 1988. The second cash was in 1994 where he made the final table, placing third, earning him $294,000. The third came in 2007 where he placed 60th, earning him $154,194.

He has cashed in the WSOP events more than two dozen times. Spadavecchia won his bracelet in the 1991 WSOP, defeating three-time bracelet winner Dewey Tomko, to win the title and $58,500 cash prize. He came close to winning a second bracelet in 1995 in the $2,500 Seven Card Stud event, but lost to Dan Robison in the heads-up play.

He has cashed in the World Series of Poker Circuit Events a total of seven times, including two first-place finishes, for a total of $791,796. That figure puts him third on the all-time total WSOP circuit event earnings list. His biggest career win came in the 2005/2006 WSOP Circuit Event - Caesars Palace no limit hold 'em $10,000 buy-in Championship. There he placed first, earning him $648,320. That win qualified him to play in the 2006 World Series of Poker Tournament of Champions.

As of 2009, his total live tournament winnings exceed $2,500,000. His 26 cashes at the WSOP account for $1,104,613 of those winnings.

Spadavecchia died on June 10, 2023 at the age of 84.
