= Howard Goldfarb =

Canadian poker player

- Born: 1961 or 1962 (age 64–65); Toronto, Ontario, Canada

World Series of Poker
- Bracelet: None
- Money finishes: 2
- Highest WSOP Main Event finish: 2nd, 1995

Howard Goldfarb (born 1961 or 1962) is a Canadian poker player, chiefly noted as the runner-up of the 1995 World Series of Poker (WSOP).

At the time he was a 33-year-old land developer and businessman from Toronto. He made his first foray into poker in 1993, when he joined some friends for a game in one of Toronto's private clubs. As a recreational poker player, he had previously entered only a few major tournaments, one of which was the 1994 World Series of Poker championship event, where he finished in 22nd place.

At the 1995 World Series of Poker main event, Goldfarb made it to the final table where he was the chip leader for a time. In the final hand of the heads up match against Dan Harrington, Goldfarb began with the best hand (Ace, 7 unsuited) to Harrington's (9, 8). Harrington paired his eight on the flop and called Goldfarb's all-in, dodged the remaining aces thus winning the championship.

Goldfarb's tournament winnings exceed $500,000.

Goldfarb is married and is the father of three children.
