= 1997 World Series of Poker =

Series of poker tournaments

- Location: Binion's Horseshoe and Fremont Street Experience, Las Vegas, Nevada
- Dates: April 19 – May 10

Champion
- (United States) Stu Ungar

The 1997 World Series of Poker (WSOP) was a series of poker tournaments held at Binion's Horseshoe. Most notably, it was the only WSOP where the Main Event final table took place outdoors, at the Fremont Street Experience, just outside Binions.

== Events ==
There were 20 preliminary bracelet events at the 1997 World Series of Poker.

#	Date	Event	Entries	Winner	Prize	Runner-up	Results
1	April 19, 1997	$2,000 Limit Hold'em	544	Kevin Song (1/1)	$397,120	Yuan Lanvin	Results
2	April 20, 1997	$1,500 Razz	160	Linda Johnson (1/1)	$96,000	Peter Brownstein	Results
3	April 21, 1997	$1,500 Limit Omaha	184	Claude Cohen (1/1)	$110,400	Frankie Havard	Results
4	April 22, 1997	$1,500 Seven Card Stud	257	Maria Stern (1/1)	$140,708	Adam Roberts	Results
5	April 23, 1997	$1,500 Pot Limit Omaha w/Rebuys	140	Chris Bjorin (1/1)	$169,200	Michael Davis	Results
6	April 24, 1997	$1,500 Seven Card Stud Hi-Lo Split	238	Doug Saab (1/1)	$130,305	Bernie Rosenthal	Results
7	April 25, 1997	$2,000 No Limit Hold'em	355	John Cernuto (1/2)	$259,150	Thomas Sparks	Results
8	April 26, 1997	$2,000 Omaha Hi-Lo Split	215	Scotty Nguyen (1/1)	$156,950	Mike Matusow	Results
9	April 27, 1997	$2,000 Pot Limit Hold'em	247	Dave Ulliott (1/1)	$180,310	Chris Truby	Results
10	April 28, 1997	$2,500 Seven Card Stud	169	Vasilis Lazarou (1/2)	$169,000	Caesar Como	Results
11	April 29, 1997	$2,500 Pot Limit Omaha w/Rebuys	87	Matthias Rohnacher (1/1)	$183,000	Surinder Sunar	Results
12	April 30, 1997	$2,500 Seven Card Stud Hi-Lo Split	117	Max Stern (1/2)	$117,000	Artie Cobb (0/3)	Results
13	May 1, 1997	$3,000 Limit Hold'em	193	Louis Asmo (1/1)	$231,600	Jim Meehan	Results
14	May 2, 1997	$3,000 Omaha Hi-Lo Split	121	Dean Stonier (1/1)	$145,200	John Hom	Results
15	May 3, 1997	$3,000 Pot Limit Hold'em	170	Phil Hellmuth (1/6)	$204,000	Tom McEvoy (0/4)	Results
16	May 4, 1997	$5,000 No Limit Deuce to Seven Draw w/Rebuys	32	Johnny Chan (1/5)	$164,250	Lyle Berman (0/3)	Results
17	May 5, 1997	$3,000 No Limit Hold'em	217	Max Stern (2/3)	$237,615	Kathy Liebert	Results
18	May 6, 1997	$5,000 Seven Card Stud	88	Mel Judah (1/2)	$176,000	Vasilis Lazarou (0/2)	Results
19	May 7, 1997	$5,000 Limit Hold'em	112	Bob Veltri (1/1)	$224,000	Ed Stevens	Results
20	May 8, 1997	$1,000 Ladies' Seven Card Stud	95	Susie Isaacs (1/2)	$38,000	Karen Wolfson (0/1)	Results
21	May 10, 1997	$10,000 No Limit Hold'em Main Event	312	Stu Ungar (1/5)	$1,000,000	John Strzemp	Results

== Main Event ==
There were 312 entrants to the main event. Each entrant paid $10,000 to enter the tournament, with the top 27 players finishing in the money. Stu Ungar won the Main Event for a record-tying third time.

=== Final table ===
Name	Number of chips (percentage of total)	WSOP Bracelets*	WSOP Cashes*	WSOP Earnings*
(United States) Stu Ungar	1,066,000 (34.1%)	4	15	$1,081,478
(United States) Ron Stanley	694,000 (22.2%)	1	10	$321,886
(United States) Bob Walker	612,000 (19.6%)	0	0	0
(Australia) Mel Judah	301,000 (9.6%)	2	13	$544,026
(United States) John Strzemp	245,000 (7.8%)	0	1	$4,632
(United States) Peter Bao	204,000 (6.5%)	0	0	0

*Career statistics prior to the beginning of the 1997 Main Event.

=== Final table results ===
Place	Name	Prize
1st	Stu Ungar	$1,000,000
2nd	John Strzemp	$583,000
3rd	Mel Judah	$371,000
4th	Ron Stanley	$212,000
5th	Bob Walker	$161,120
6th	Peter Bao	$127,200

=== In The Money Finishes ===
NB: This list is restricted to In The Money finishers with an existing Wikipedia entry.

Place	Name	Prize
9th	Chris Björin	$48,760
12th	Marsha Waggoner	$33,920
13th	Jay Heimowitz	$29,680
14th	Andrew Black	$29,680
15th	Rod Peate	$29,680
16th	Doyle Brunson	$25,440
18th	Ken Flaton	$25,440
19th	Paul Clark	$21,200
21st	Phil Hellmuth	$21,200
22nd	Billy Baxter	$21,200
