= Bruce Hershenson =

American businessman

Bruce Hershenson is an American entrepreneur who in 1999 founded the movie memorabilia auction company eMoviePoster. He is a collector of movie pressbooks and has edited 43 movie poster history books.

== Movie collectibles career ==
Hershenson began his career in movie posters in 1990, when auction house Christie's offered to sell some of his collection. He conducted an annual movie poster auction at Christie's for the following eight years, grossing between $1.5 million and $2 million each year.

By 1998, Hershenson's customers and friends were increasingly suggesting he try selling his merchandise using online auction company eBay. Hershenson was skeptical of the company's value in selling rare collectibles. eBay became a public corporation in September 1998, and in 1999, Hershenson decided to begin posting some of his items on the auction company's website. Hershenson believed that some eBay sellers sold their vintage collectibles for much more than their fair market price, due to high fixed prices and less knowledgeable buyers. Unlike these sellers, Hershenson instead began each of his auctions at $2.99, hoping to build a loyal customer base. In the first 6 months he lost money, selling items for much lower than their market value. At the end of 2001, Hershenson had posted his first online major movie poster auction, which grossed $776,000, with each piece selling for an average of $1,000.

In 2008, after selling approximately 330,000 vintage movie posters on eBay, Hershenson began selling exclusively on his own website, eMoviePoster.com, due to an objection with changes to eBay's rules and increases in their listing fees. As of 2015, Hershenson's website reports an increase in sales each year, with just over $4 million in 2012, and an average of over $5 million per year in 2013 through 2016. In December 2013, the website sold a one-sheet poster from The Grim Game starring Harry Houdini for $67,166, a new world record at that time for a Houdini poster (movie or magic).

Hershenson has claimed to have seen a dramatic rise in damage to mailing tubes sent via USPS Priority Mail during 2021, and that these packages routinely take longer to be delivered than before.

== Other professional activities ==
Hershenson had been a professional poker player in the 1970s and early 1980s, and won the Seven Card Stud event in the 1979 Super Bowl of Poker and the Seven Card Razz event in the 1981 World Series of Poker.

Starting in the early 1980s, Hershenson traded stock options on the floor of the Philadelphia Stock Exchange until shortly after the stock market crash of 1987, when he left the stock exchange in search of a more stable business.

Hershenson published three comic books by Steve Ditko, The Avenging World in 1973, Wha !?! in 1974, and Mr. A #2 in 1975.

== Personal life ==
Hershenson is known for giving out full size candy bars for Halloween, and has done so for 25 years as of 2021.
