= Sarge Ferris =

American poker player (1928–1989)

Fred Ferris
- Nickname: Sarge
- Born: December 1, 1928; Waterville, Maine, U.S.
- Died: March 12, 1989 (aged 60); Las Vegas, Nevada, U.S.

World Series of Poker
- Bracelet: 1
- Money finish: 1
- Highest WSOP Main Event finish: None

Fred Bernard "Sarge" Ferris (December 1, 1928 – March 12, 1989) was an American poker player.

In the 1980 World Series of Poker, Ferris won a World Series of Poker bracelet in deuce-to-seven draw, winning $150,000. He defeated some of the best professional poker players of that time to win the tournament, including two-time world champion Doyle Brunson, who finished the tournament in second place, and 1978 WSOP Main Event champion Bobby Baldwin, who finished third.

He won a No Limit 2–7 Lowball tournament at the 1983 Super Bowl of Poker, organized by Amarillo Slim. Ferris was mainly a cash game player, but also had tournament winnings exceeding $240,000.

On April 22, 1983, Ferris gained notoriety as the Internal Revenue Service seized $46,000 during a high-stakes game at the Horseshoe Casino.

Ferris died in March 1989, and was posthumously inducted into the Poker Hall of Fame in December of that year.
