= 1979 Super Bowl of Poker =

Poker tournament

The Super Bowl of Poker (also known as Amarillo Slim's Super Bowl of Poker or SBOP) was the second most prestigious poker tournament in the world during the 1980s. While the World Series of Poker was already drawing larger crowds as more and more amateurs sought it out, the SBOP "was an affair limited almost exclusively to pros and hard-core amateurs."

Prior to 1979, the only high dollar tournament a person could enter was the WSOP. 1972 WSOP Main Event Champion and outspoken ambassador for poker Amarillo Slim saw this as an opportunity. "The World Series of Poker was so successful that everybody wanted more than one tournament," he said. Slim called upon his connections and friendships with poker's elite to start a new tournament in the February 1979. Before the SBOP had developed a reputation of its own, many of the most respected names in poker attended the tournament "more to support Slim and take advantage of the very fat cash games the event would obviously inspire." Slim modelled his SBOP after the WSOP with several events and a $10,000 Texas Hold'em Main Event.

One of the principal differences between the WSOP and the SBOP was the prize structure. The WSOP's prize structure was flat ensuring more people received smaller pieces of the prize pool. The SBOP typically used a 60-30-10 payout structure. In other words, only the first three places received money and generally in the ratio of 60% to first place, 30% to second place, and 10% to third. This payment schedule predominated the SBOP for the first 5 years of the event, but as the event grew the number of payouts increased while keeping the payout schedule top heavy.

== 1979 Tournament ==
As one of the original participants in the WSOP, the 1979 tournament was built upon Amarillo Slim's popularity and reputation. Many of the biggest names showed up at the event. Despite the limited number of cash prizes offered at the SBOP, Poker Hall of Famer Johnny Moss succeeded in making it to the cash 4 times. Doyle Brunson, another Hall of Famer, finished in second place in the $1,000 Ace to five Lowball event. 2003 Poker Hall of Fame inductee Bobby Baldwin won the $5,000 Seven card Stud event.

== Key ==
*	Elected to the Poker Hall of Fame.
Place	The place in which people finish.
Name	The name of the player
Prize (US$)	Event prize money

=== Event 1: $ 10,000 No Limit Hold'em ===
- Number of buy-ins: 30
- Total prize pool: $300,000
- Number of payouts: 7

Final table
Place	Name	Prize
1st	George Huber	$150,000
2nd	Robert Bone	$60,000
3rd	Charles Dunwoody	$30,000
4th	Junior Whited	$15,000
5th	Louis Hunsucker	$15,000
6th	George Malooly	$15,000
7th	Johnny Moss*	$15,000

=== Event 2: $ 10,000 No Limit Deuce-to-Seven Draw ===
- Number of buy-ins: Unknown
- Total prize pool: Unknown
- Number of payouts: 2

Final table
Place	Name	Prize
1st	Byron Wolford	Unknown
2nd	Johnny Moss*	Unknown

=== Event 3: $ 200 Ladies Seven Card Stud ===
- Number of buy-ins: 53
- Total prize pool: $10,600
- Number of payouts: 3

Final table
Place	Name	Prize
1st	Jane Drache	$6,460
2nd	Nell Kelly	$2,180
3rd	Jean Mattox	$1,060

=== Event 4: $ 1,000 Ace to five Lowball ===
- Number of buy-ins: 45
- Total prize pool: $45,000
- Number of payouts: 3

Final table
Place	Name	Prize
1st	Jack O'Diamonds	$27,000
2nd	Doyle Brunson*	$13,500
3rd	Clyde Hill	$4,500

=== Event 5: $ 1,000 Seven card Stud ===
- Number of buy-ins: 44
- Total prize pool: $44,000
- Number of payouts: 3

Final table
Place	Name	Prize
1st	Bruce Hershenson	$26,400
2nd	Dick James	$13,200
3rd	Lakewood Louie	$4,400

=== Event 6: $ 5,000 Seven card Stud ===
- Number of buy-ins: 11
- Total prize pool: $55,000
- Number of payouts: 3

Final table
Place	Name	Prize
1st	Bobby Baldwin*	$26,400
2nd	Eric Drache	$13,200
3rd	A Meyers	$4,400

=== Event 7: $ 1,000 Razz ===
- Number of buy-ins: 33
- Total prize pool: $33,000
- Number of payouts: 3

Final table
Place	Name	Prize
1st	David Sklansky	$26,400
2nd	Gary Berland	$13,200
3rd	S Said	$4,400

=== Event 8: $ 5,000 Razz ===
- Number of buy-ins: 11
- Total prize pool: $55,000
- Number of payouts: 3

Final table
Place	Name	Prize
1st	Doc Thomas	$33,000
2nd	Gary Berland	$16,500
3rd	S Said	$5,500

=== Event 9: $ 2,500 Seven Card Stud Hi/Lo Split ===
- Number of buy-ins: 15
- Total prize pool: $37,500
- Number of payouts: 3

Final table
Place	Name	Prize
1st	Dan Robison	$22,500
2nd	Jess Jackson	$11,250
3rd	Gary Berland	$3,750

=== Event 10: $ 10,000 Deuce to Seven Lowball ===
- Number of buy-ins: 11
- Total prize pool: $55,000
- Number of payouts: 3

Final table
Place	Name	Prize
1st	Byron Wolford	$78,000
2nd	Johnny Moss*	$37,000
3rd	Carl Rouss	$13,000

=== Event 11: $ 1,000 Hold'em ===
- Number of buy-ins: 130
- Total prize pool: $130,000
- Number of payouts: 3

Final table
Place	Name	Prize
1st	George Malooly	$78,000
2nd	Johnny Moss*	$37,000
3rd	Hal Thomas	$13,000
