= Mike Hart (poker player) =

American poker player

World Series of Poker
- Bracelets: 4
- Money finishes: 18
- Highest WSOP Main Event finish: 2nd, 1986

Mike Hart is an American poker player from Winter Haven, Florida.

Hart is a veteran of many years at the World Series of Poker and has won four WSOP championship bracelets, with two bracelets in Razz, one in limit Texas hold 'em and one in seven-card stud eight or better. He has cashed in various other events at the WSOP.

In the 1986 WSOP Main Event, he finished runner-up to Berry Johnston and won $228,000.

As of 2017, Hart's total live tournament winnings exceeded $1,600,000. His 18 cashes at the WSOP account for $820,568 of those winnings.

== World Series of Poker bracelets ==
Year	Tournament	Prize (US$)
1984	$1,000 Seven-Card Razz	$40,000
1990	$1,500 Limit Hold'em	$252,000
1991	$1,500 Seven-Card Stud Split	$106,200
1994	$1,500 Seven-Card Razz	$88,800
