= Brent Carter =

American poker player (1948–2026)

- Born: September 28, 1948
- Died: August 19, 2026 (aged 77)

World Series of Poker
- Bracelets: 2
- Money finishes: 46
- Highest WSOP Main Event finish: 3rd, 1995

World Poker Tour
- Title: None
- Final table: None
- Money finishes: 2

Brent R. Carter (September 28, 1948 – August 19, 2026) was an American professional poker player from Oak Park, Illinois who won two World Series of Poker bracelets.

== Poker career ==
Carter finished in the money of a World Series of Poker (WSOP) event in 1991 in the $1,500 seven-card stud event. He won his first bracelet the same year in the $1,500 No Limit Texas hold 'em event, defeating O'Neil Longson in the final heads-up confrontation. He won a second bracelet in 1994 at the $1,500 limit Omaha event. Carter also won a Hall of Fame tournament bracelet in Pot Limit Omaha. Carter finished in the money of the WSOP $10,000 No Limit Texas Hold'em main event in 1991 (15th), 1992 (31st), and 1995 (3rd).

In 1995 and 1996, Carter won the Best All-Around Player Award at the Four Queens Poker Classic.

On September 10, 2008, Carter, who used the name '92848' on PokerStars, won a World Championship of Online Poker bracelet in event #11, a $320 buy-in Pot-Limit Omaha Hi/Lo tournament. He bested a field of 1,733 players to win the $88,383 first prize.

As of 2009, his total live tournament winnings exceeded $2,900,000. His 46 cashes at the WSOP account for $1,286,821 of those winnings.

== Death ==
Carter's death was announced on 19 August 2026. He was 77.

== World Series of Poker bracelets ==
Year	Tournament	Prize (US$)
1991	$1,500 No Limit Hold'em	$166,800
1994	$1,500 Pot Limit Omaha	$169,200
