= 1992 World Series of Poker =

Series of poker tournaments

- Location: Binion's Horseshoe, Las Vegas, Nevada
- Dates: April 22 – May 16

Champion
- (Iran) Hamid Dastmalchi

The 1992 World Series of Poker (WSOP) was a series of poker tournaments held at Binion's Horseshoe.

== Events ==
There were 19 preliminary events at the 1992 World Series of Poker.

#	Date	Event	Entries	Winner	Prize	Runner-up	Results
1	April 22, 1992	$1,500 Pot Limit Omaha	135	Billy Thomas (1/1)	$81,000	Joe Lazar	Results
2	April 23, 1992	$1,500 No Limit Hold'em	254	Lance Straughn (1/1)	$152,400	Greg Angel	Results
3	April 24, 1992	$1,500 Seven Card Stud Hi-Lo Split	175	Rick Steiner (1/1)	$105,000	Marsha Waggoner	Results
4	April 25, 1992	$2,500 Limit Hold'em	168	Erik Seidel (1/1)	$168,000	Phil Hellmuth (0/1)	Results
5	April 26, 1992	$2,500 Seven Card Stud	106	Ray Rumler (1/2)	$106,000	Esther Rossi	Results
6	April 27, 1992	$1,500 Seven Card Stud	201	Men Nguyen (1/1)	$120,600	Tom McEvoy (0/3)	Results
7	April 28, 1992	$1,500 Limit Omaha	132	Tom McEvoy (1/4)	$79,200	Berry Johnston (0/3)	Results
8	April 29, 1992	$5,000 Limit Hold'em	88	Phil Hellmuth (1/2)	$168,000	Steve Kopp	Results
9	April 30, 1992	$1,500 Razz	134	Lamar Hampton (1/1)	$80,400	Men Nguyen (0/1)	Results
10	May 1, 1992	$1,000 Ladies' Seven Card Stud	155	Shari Flanzer (1/1)	$38,000	Kim Alford	Results
11	May 2, 1992	$2,500 Pot Limit Hold'em	134	Kenny Duggan (1/1)	$134,000	Noli Francisco	Results
12	May 3, 1992	$1,500 Ace to Five Draw	150	Dal Derovin (1/1)	$90,000	Vince Burgio	Results
13	May 4, 1992	$5,000 Pot Limit Omaha	48	Hoyt Corkins (1/1)	$96,000	O'Neil Longson	Results
14	May 5, 1992	$5,000 Seven Card Stud	61	Paul Clark (1/1)	$122,000	Ray Rumler (0/1)	Results
15	May 6, 1992	$1,500 Pot Limit Hold'em	193	Buddy Bonnecaze (1/1)	$115,800	Jimmy Athanas	Results
16	May 7, 1992	$2,500 No Limit Hold'em	192	Lyle Berman (1/2)	$192,000	Humberto Brenes	Results
17	May 8, 1992	$1,500 Omaha Hi-Lo Split	204	Eli Balas (1/1)	$122,400	Marlon De Los Santos	Results
18	May 9, 1992	$5,000 No Limit Deuce to Seven Draw	53	Mickey Appleman (1/2)	$119,250	Huck Seed	Results
19	May 10, 1992	$1,500 Limit Hold'em	378	Bob Abell (1/1)	$226,800	Rocky Romano	Results
20	May 11, 1992	$10,000 No Limit Hold'em Main Event	201	Hamid Dastmalchi (1/2)	$1,000,000	Tom Jacobs	Results

== Main Event ==
There were 201 entrants to the main event. Each paid $10,000 to enter the tournament, with the top 36 players finishing in the money. Until the 2007 WSOP Main Event, this was the only Main Event that there were fewer participants than the prior year.

=== Final table ===
Place	Name	Prize
1st	Hamid Dastmalchi	$1,000,000
2nd	Tom Jacobs	$353,500
3rd	Hans Lund	$176,750
4th	Mike Alsaadi	$101,000
5th	Dave Crunkleton	$60,600
6th	Clyde Coleman	$30,300

=== In The Money Finishes ===
NB: This list is restricted to In The Money finishers with an existing Wikipedia entry.

Place	Name	Prize
7th	Johnny Chan	$25,250
8th	Jack Keller	$20,200
13th	Todd Brunson	$10,100
15th	Bobby Baldwin	$10,100
17th	Berry Johnston	$10,100
21st	Telly Savalas	$8,080
22nd	Barry Greenstein	$8,080
23rd	Mike Sexton	$8,080
24th	Mel Judah	$8,080
25th	Chris Björin	$8,080
34th	Dewey Tomko	$7,070
