= Hans Lund =

American poker player (1950–2009)

- Nickname: Tuna
- Born: September 23, 1950
- Died: November 6, 2009 (aged 59)

World Series of Poker
- Bracelets: 2
- Money finishes: 22
- Highest WSOP Main Event finish: 2nd, 1990

World Poker Tour
- Title: None
- Final table: None
- Money finishes: 4

Hans J. "Tuna" Lund (September 23, 1950 – November 6, 2009) was an American professional poker player, based in Sparks, Nevada, who won two World Series of Poker (WSOP) bracelets, and was the runner-up at the 1990 WSOP Main Event.

== Poker career ==
Lund began playing poker tournaments in 1977 and won a bracelet at the 1978 World Series of Poker (WSOP) in the $1,500 no limit hold'em event. A decade later, he finished 2nd in the same event at the 1988 WSOP.

At the 1990 WSOP Lund was heads-up against Mansour Matloubi. On the decisive hand, he had a slight chip lead before the hand started, when with A-9 offsuit he called a pre-flop raise from Matloubi. He raised Matloubi's bet on the 9–4–2 flop; after deliberation, Matloubi moved all in with 10–10; Lund also deliberated, then called. An ace on the turn meant Lund only had to avoid the last two tens in the deck for the championship, but a ten came on the river. He eventually finished runner-up, with Matloubi taking the title.

He finished in the money of the Main Event in 1991 (19th), 1992 (3rd), 2006 (315th), and 2007 (319th).

Lund went on to win a second bracelet at the 1996 WSOP in the $1,500 Ace to Five Draw event.

In addition to his two bracelets, Lund won a Hall of Fame watch, the Super Bowl of Poker main event, and the Best All-Around Player Award at the Diamond Jim Brady tournament.

Lund retired from playing tournaments on a regular basis in 1997. He often also competed in the yearly Club Cal Neva Horse Racing Championship in Reno, Nevada, winning this large event twice. Lund made a resurgence on the tournament circuit with two deep finishes at World Poker Tour events in 2007. He finished in 20th place at the L.A. Poker Classic, and 15th place at the Bay 101 Shooting Star. He also cashed in the 2006 and 2007 WSOP Main Events and in the 2006 Five-Diamond World Poker Classic championship event.

His total live tournament winnings exceeded $2,900,000, with his 22 cashes at the WSOP accounting for $1,079,504 of those winnings.

Lund died November 6, 2009, in Mound House, Nevada, at the age of 59, after a long battle with cancer. Lund's gravesite and marker is located in the cemetery at Dayton, Nevada

=== World Series of Poker bracelets ===
Year	Tournament	Prize (US$)
1978	$1,500 No Limit Hold'em	$46,800
1996	$1,500 Ace to Five Draw	$71,400
