= World Poker Open =

The World Poker Open was one of the annual events on the World Poker Tour.

Final Table
Year	Winner	Prize	Casino	Network	Notes
2003	Dave Ulliott	$589,175	Binion's Horseshoe		
2004	Barry Greenstein	$1,278,370	Binion's Horseshoe	Travel Channel	
2005	Johnny Stolzmann	$1,491,444	Gold Strike Tunica		
2006	Scotty Nguyen	$969,421	Gold Strike Tunica		
2007	Bryan Sumner	$939,486	Gold Strike Tunica		
2008	Brett Faustman	$892,413	Gold Strike Tunica		
