= Brad Daugherty (poker player) =

American poker player (born 1951)

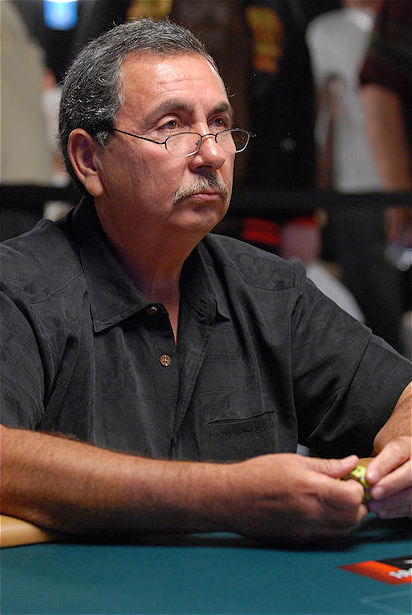
- Daugherty at the 2009 World Series of Poker
- Born: July 5, 1951 (age 75); Mountain Grove, Missouri, U.S.

World Series of Poker
- Bracelet: 1
- Money finishes: 19
- Highest WSOP Main Event finish: Winner, 1991

World Poker Tour
- Title: None
- Final table: None
- Money finishes: 2

Brad Daugherty (born July 5, 1951, in Mountain Grove, Missouri) is a professional poker player.

Daugherty began playing poker in 1969 on a high school trip. Following high school he worked in the construction industry, but after hearing of large prize money for tournament winnings, in 1978 he moved to Reno, Nevada. In 1987 he won his first tournament.

Daugherty was awarded the first ever million-dollar first-place prize at the World Series of Poker when he won the bracelet in the 1991 Main Event, and finished in ninth place in 1993. As of 2009, his total live tournament winnings exceed $1,700,000. His 19 cashes as the WSOP account for $1,158,574 of those winnings.

Daugherty is the co-author with Tom McEvoy of Championship Satellite Strategy and No-Limit Texas Hold'em for New Players. He is married, has three sons, and currently resides in the Philippines, where he attempted to raise money for impoverished families by putting his 1991 WSOP bracelet up for auction on eBay twice in 2010 and 2011, with it going unsold both times due to bids not meeting his reserve price.

== World Series of Poker Bracelets ==
Year	Tournament	Prize (US$)
1991	$10,000 No Limit Hold'em World Championship	$1,000,000
