= Carolyn Gardner =

American poker player

World Series of Poker
- Bracelet: 1
- Money finishes: 10
- Highest WSOP Main Event finish: None

Carolyn Gardner is a World Series of Poker champion. She won the 1983 $500 Ladies - Limit 7 Card Stud event for $16,000.

As of 2008, her total WSOP tournament winnings exceed $61,701.

== World Series of Poker bracelets ==
Year	Tournament	Prize (US$)
1983	$500 Ladies - Limit 7 Card Stud	$16,000
