= Karen Wolfson =

American poker player

World Series of Poker
- Bracelet: 1
- Final tables: 3
- Money finishes: 5
- Highest WSOP Main Event finish: None

Karen Wolfson is a poker player from Las Vegas, Nevada. She has cashed in various poker tournaments during her career, and has several titles including one World Series of Poker bracelet.

== World Series of Poker ==
She won her championship in the 1984 World Series of Poker $500 Ladies Limit Seven Card Stud event, earning a bracelet and a cash prize of $15,500. She defeated professional player Marsha Waggoner heads-up to win the tournament. This event was the first time that Wolfson had finished in the money at the World Series of Poker.

Wolfson finished as the runner-up of the Ladies event, then a $1,000 buy-in Seven Card Stud event in 1995, losing heads-up to Starla Brodie, and again in 1997, losing heads-up to Susie Isaacs.

As of 2010, her total tournament winnings exceed $190,000. Her five cashes at the World Series of Poker make up $62,560 of that total.

=== World Series of Poker bracelet ===
Year	Tournament	Prize (US$)
1984	$500 Ladies - Limit 7 Card Stud	$15,500
