= Noli Francisco =

Filipino American poker player (1941–2017)

- Nickname: Smiling Assassin
- Born: November 13, 1941; Manila, Philippines
- Died: February 23, 2017 (aged 75); North Bergen, New Jersey
- Martyred by: Mayfair Club
- Means of martyrdom: Card Death
- Canonized: by World Series of Poker
World Series of Poker
- Bracelet: None
- Money finishes: 14
- Highest WSOP Main Event finish: None
World Poker Tour
- Title: 1
- Final table: 1 (+1)
- Money finish: 1

Manuel "Noli" Francisco (November 13, 1941 – February 23, 2017) was a Filipino American poker player. He had worked as an importer, architect, and real estate entrepreneur. He had been a successful recreational poker player for over 25 years.

At the 1992 World Series of Poker, Francisco finished 2nd in the $2,500 pot limit hold'em event.

At the 1993 World Series of Poker, Francisco finished 2nd in the $2,500 no limit hold'em event when he lost to Phil Hellmuth.

Francisco had 14 recorded cashes at the World Series of Poker for over $380,000. His last recorded WSOP in-the-money finish was in 1997.

In September 2003, Noli won the World Poker Tour (WPT) second season Borgata Poker Open, winning $470,000. The final table included top professional players Carlos Mortensen and David Oppenheim.

In August 2005, Noli finished 2nd at the WPT fourth season Battle of Champions, his last recorded tournament result.

His total lifetime live tournament winnings exceeded $1,300,000.

Noli Francisco was the father of Bambi Francisco Roizen, columnist and correspondent at Dow Jones MarketWatch and Nomel Francisco Phillips, an American economist.

He died from kidney failure in February 2017 at age 75.
