= Marie Gabert =

American poker player

World Series of Poker
- Bracelet: 1
- Money finishes: 5
- Highest WSOP Main Event finish: None

Marie Gabert was a World Series of Poker champion in the 1990 $500 Ladies - Limit 7 Card Stud.

Gabert has 18 first-place finishes to her name over three decades. As of 2018, her total tournament winnings exceed $400,000.

== World Series of Poker bracelets ==
Year	Tournament	Prize (US$)
1990	$500 Ladies - Limit 7 Card Stud	$22,000
