= Byron Wolford =

American poker player (1930–2003)

- Nickname: Cowboy
- Born: September 14, 1930
- Died: May 13, 2003 (aged 72)

World Series of Poker
- Bracelet: 1
- Money finishes: 10
- Highest WSOP Main Event finish: 2nd, 1984

Byron Wolford (September 14, 1930 – May 13, 2003), also known as Cowboy Wolford, was an American rodeo cowboy and professional poker player, who was the winner of a World Series of Poker bracelet in 1991 and runner-up in the 1984 World Series of Poker Main Event.

Wolford cashed in various events at the World Series of Poker (WSOP), including the Main Event. He achieved his highest Main Event showing in 1984 when he finished as runner-up to Jack Keller. For his second-place finish, Wolford won $264,000. Over the years, Wolford made the final tables in other events at the WSOP, finishing in second place on several occasions.

He won a WSOP bracelet in 1991 in the $5,000 limit Texas hold 'em event, defeating fellow professional Erik Seidel. His career winnings were $1,012,500, with his nine cashes at the WSOP accounting for $782,410 of his lifetime winnings.

Wolford also won the $10,000 No Limit Deuce-to-Seven Draw at the inaugural Super Bowl of Poker in 1979.

As a rodeo champion, Wolford set the all-time speed record for calf roping at Madison Square Garden in the 1950s. He also won back-to-back championships at the Calgary Stampede. Wolford was the author of the book, "Cowboys, Gamblers & Hustlers: The True Adventures of a Rodeo Champion & Poker Legend".

== World Series of Poker Bracelets ==
Year	Tournament	Prize (US$)
1991	$5,000 Limit hold 'em	$210,000
