= Hamid Dastmalchi =

Iranian-American poker player

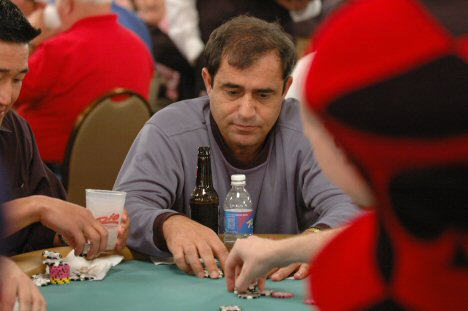
- Dastmalchi in the World Series of Poker

World Series of Poker
- Bracelets: 3
- Final tables: 7
- Money finishes: 10
- Highest WSOP Main Event finish: Winner, 1992

World Poker Tour
- Title: None
- Final table: None
- Money finish: 1

Hamid Reza Dastmalchi (Persian: حمیدرضا دستمالچی) is an Iranian-American professional poker player.

Dastmalchi finished in fifth place in the 1985 WSOP Main Event for a total prize of $70,000. Dastmalchi won the 1992 World Series of Poker (WSOP) Main Event, which is his largest tournament win with a prize of $1 million. He again made the final table of the Main Event in 1995, finishing in fourth place.

Dastmalchi was involved in a legal dispute in 1999 with Binion's Horseshoe after the new management would not let him cash in $865,000 in chips he had won under the prior management. A gaming commission ultimately ruled the chips should be cashed.

In his career, Dastmalchi has won three WSOP bracelets, his last victory coming in 1993.

Dastmalchi's last major tournament cash came in 2002 in the World Poker Tour Five Diamond World Poker Classic.

Although he rarely plays in tournaments anymore, his total live tournament winnings exceed $1,800,000 as of 2009, with his ten cashes at the WSOP accounting for $1,600,760 of those winnings.

== World Series of Poker Bracelets ==
Year	Tournament	Prize (US$)
1986	$1,500 No Limit Hold'em	$165,000
1992	$10,000 No Limit Hold'em World Championship	$1,000,000
1993	$2,500 Pot Limit Hold'em	$114,000
