= Vince Burgio =

American poker player (born 1935)

- Nickname: Plaza Vince
- Born: c. 1940 (age 85–86); Kansas City, Missouri, U.S.

World Series of Poker
- Bracelet: 1
- Final tables: 7
- Money finishes: 28
- Highest WSOP Main Event finish: 4th, 1994

World Poker Tour
- Title: None
- Final table: 1
- Money finish: 1

Vincent Burgio (born c. 1940) is an American professional poker player and writer. A member of the Senior Poker Hall of Fame, he was a columnist for Card Player Magazine and is the author of Pizza, Pasta and Poker and Inside Poker: The Good, the Bad and the Ugly. He is based in West Hills, California.

== Early life and education ==
Born in Kansas City, Missouri, Burgio first learned to play poker at the age of eight, playing penny ante with his family at Christmas. He is a graduate of the University of Missouri, and moved to California in 1976.

== Poker career ==
In 1987, Burgio sold his construction business to focus on playing in poker tournaments full-time.

Burgio came to note as the winner of best all-around player award at the 1992 Queens Poker Classic. By 1994, he held four titles from the classic, plus an Ace-to-Draw title from the Poker Hall of Fame.

Burgio won his first World Series of Poker in 1994, defeating 211 opponents for the title. He won a WSOP bracelet in the Seven-Card Stud Hi-Lo event, defeating a final table including both Howard "The Professor" Lederer and Jay Heimowitz. Burgio also made the final table of the $10,000 no limit hold'em main event that year, finishing in 4th place. He also finished in the money of the Main Event in 1998.

Burgio has made one World Poker Tour (WPT) final table, finishing 5th in the first season Gold Rush event won by Paul Darden.

Burgio has also competed in numerous events of the Ultimate Poker Challenge and has won two events.

As of 2025, his total live tournament winnings exceed $2,200,000.

== Writing career ==
Burgio wrote a regular column for CardPlayer Magazine. He was called "The Andy Rooney of Poker" for his coverage of "quirky" human interest stories.

He has authored his autobiography entitled Pizza, Pasta and Poker: The Private & Public Life of a Professional Poker Player.

== Personal life ==
His wife, Debbie Burgio, supported his decision to become a full-time poker player. He has four grown daughters.
