= Dan Robison =

American poker and gin rummy player

- Born: c. 1945
- Died: 2014 (aged 68–69)

World Series of Poker
- Bracelet: 1
- Money finishes: 6

Dan Robison (c. 1945 – 2014) was an American professional poker player and gin rummy player originally from Dayton, Ohio.

Robison attended Fairmont High School in the Dayton suburb of Kettering, graduating in 1963. He lettered in basketball and golf. The golf team won state championships in 1961 and 1963 along with a runner-up finish in 1962.

In 1973 he came to Las Vegas as the partner of Chip Reese. After Robison and Reese won a substantial amount of money from poker in a short period of time they became known as the Golddust Twins. After becoming addicted to cocaine, Robison went to rehab and later became a born again Christian.

He was considered one of the best cash game seven-card stud players in the world. He won a World Series of Poker bracelet in 1995 in the $2,500 seven card stud event, and has cashed four other times in World Series of Poker stud events.

His total lifetime live tournament winnings exceed $225,000.
