= J. C. Pearson (poker player) =

American poker player (1933–2021)

World Series of Poker
- Bracelet: 1
- Final tables: 6
- Money finishes: 12
- Highest WSOP Main Event finish: 19th, 1994

J. C. Pearson (January 29, 1933 – January 18, 2021) was a professional poker player originally from Tennessee who won a bracelet at the World Series of Poker. He is a brother of World Series of Poker bracelet winner Puggy Pearson.

Pearson was born and raised in Tennessee and had eight siblings. He followed in his brother's footsteps and moved to Las Vegas, Nevada to play poker and has been an active player since the early 1980s.

He won one WSOP bracelet: at the 1994 World Series of Poker in the $2,500 Limit Omaha Hi-Lo Split event, defeating Matthias Rohnacher during heads-up play. In addition to the bracelet, Pearson earned a cash prize of $103,000. Earlier in the same series, Pearson finished runner-up to O'Neil Longson in the $1,500 Pot Limit Omaha event.

When J. C. won his bracelet, he and brother Puggy became the first brothers to win bracelets at the World Series of Poker. They remained the only brothers to have bracelets until the 2008 World Series of Poker when brothers Blair Hinkle and Grant Hinkle both won a bracelet.

Pearson also cashed in the $10,000 No Limit Holdem Main Event in 1994, finishing in 19th place and earning $16,800. His total live tournament earnings exceed $900,000. His 12 cashes at the World Series of Poker make up $250,744 of that total.
