= Vasilis Lazarou =

Greek poker player

- Born: Methana, Greece

World Series of Poker
- Bracelets: 2
- Money finishes: 18

Vasilis Lazarou is a Greek professional poker player who has won two bracelets at the World Series of Poker. He is mainly a seven card stud player, but he has cashed in various other poker tournament games as well.

Lazarou was born in Methana, a small town in Greece and lives in Las Vegas, Nevada.

== Poker career ==
Lazarou first cashed in the WSOP in 1990 and also won his first bracelet that year in the $1,500 Seven Card Stud event, winning a cash prize of $158,400 in addition to the title.

He won his second bracelet in the 1997 WSOP, in the $2,500 Seven Card Stud tournament, earning $169,000. Later in the same WSOP, Lazarou came close to winning a third career bracelet in the $5,000 Seven Card Stud event, but finished as the runner-up.

As of 2012, Lazarou has total tournament winnings over $700,000. His 18 cashes at the World Series of Poker account for $575,144 of that total.

=== World Series of Poker Bracelets ===
Year	Tournament	Prize (US$)
1990	$1,500 Seven Card Stud	$158,400
1997	$2,500 Seven Card Stud	$169,000
