= Nani Dollison =

South Korean-born American poker player (born 1953)

- Born: 1953 (age 72–73); South Korea

World Series of Poker
- Bracelets: 3
- Final tables: 3
- Money finishes: 8
- Highest WSOP Main Event finish: 115th, 2005

Kun Nan "Nani" Dollison (born 1953 in South Korea) is an American professional poker player from Hernando, Mississippi, who is a three-time World Series of Poker (WSOP) champion.

As of 2010, her total live tournament winnings exceed $775,000. Her eight cashes as the WSOP account for $600,515 of those winnings.

== World Series of Poker bracelets ==
Year	Event	Prize Money
2000	$1,000 Women's Championship (Limit Hold'em / Seven-card stud)	$53,200
2001	$2,000 Limit Hold'em	$441,440
2001	$1,000 Women's Championship No-Limit Hold'em	$41,130
