= Marsha Waggoner =

Australian-born American poker player

- Nickname: The Grand Dame of Poker
- Born: January 11, 1940 (age 86)

World Series of Poker
- Bracelet: None
- Money finishes: 20
- Highest WSOP Main Event finish: 12th, 1997

World Poker Tour
- Title: None
- Final table: None
- Money finishes: 7

Marsha Waggoner (born January 11, 1940 in Brisbane, Queensland, Australia) is an American professional poker player who lives in Las Vegas, Nevada.

Waggoner has finished in the money at 20 World Series of Poker (WSOP) events as of 2010. Her highest WSOP finish was 2nd place in the 23rd Annual WSOP tournament in Limit 7 Card Stud Hi/Lo, for which she won $52,500.

== Poker career ==
=== Background ===
In 1976, as a casino dealer in Sydney, Waggoner discovered a talent for stud poker, and in 1977, moved to Reno, Nevada to pursue poker professionally.

Most of her experience up until this point was in cash games, however her interest in tournament games was piqued when Amarillo Slim brought the Second Annual Poker Classic to Reno in 1980. Waggoner stayed in Reno until the mid-1980s, at which point she moved to Las Vegas, quickly demonstrating her ability at tournament Texas Hold 'em and Seven-Card Stud events.

In 1987, Waggoner moved to California while continuing to play professionally. It was around this time that Waggoner began to establish herself as "a solid and patient tournament player whose results continually proved she belonged in the game's upper echelons".

In 2008, she was one of four inaugural inductees into the Women in Poker Hall of Fame at Binion's Gambling Hall and Hotel in Las Vegas.

In 2010, she was inducted into the Australian Poker Hall of Fame.

=== Results ===
Waggoner’s best tournament placing was winning the 2003 National Championship of Poker, playing in the Limit 7 Card Stud Hi/Lo event, a low limit buy in at Hollywood Park Casino.

In 2005, Waggoner was invited to play in the World Poker Tour’s third annual Legends of Poker Ladies Night tournament at the Bicycle Casino, and finished third in one event of the 2006 Ultimate Poker Challenge.

As of 2010, her total live tournament winnings exceed $830,000.

== Personal life ==
Waggoner is currently single; in 2008 she separated from fellow poker professional Kenna James, whom she met at the Hollywood Park Casino in 1997. She has three children from a previous marriage and five grandchildren, and enjoys playing golf and dancing.

Although she has lived in America for more than 30 years, Waggoner still visits her home country regularly to compete in poker tournaments (such as the Aussie Millions) and see her extended family.

Waggoner's brother is the noted former Australian photojournalist Jim Fenwick.
