= Mansour Matloubi =

Iranian-British poker player (born 1952)

- Born: 1952 (age 73–74)

World Series of Poker
- Bracelet: 1
- Money finishes: 14
- Highest WSOP Main Event finish: Winner, 1990

Mansour Matloubi (born 1952) is an Iranian-British professional poker player living in London.

Matloubi won the 1990 World Series of Poker Main Event for $835,000, becoming the first non-American to win the title. Later that year, he had a runner-up finish in the $10,000 No Limit Hold'em event at the 6th Annual Diamond Jim Brady for $160,000. He made the final table of the 1993 Main Event, where he finished in fourth place for $120,000. In the 1994 World Poker Finals at Mashantucket, he won $72,000 for a win in the $10,000 No Limit Hold'em tournament.

As of 2016, his total live tournament winnings exceed $2,010,000. His 14 cashes at the WSOP account for $1,214,062 of those winnings.

== World Series of Poker Bracelets ==
Year	Tournament	Prize (US$)
1990	$10,000 No Limit Hold'em World Championship	$835,000
