= Scotty Nguyen =

Vietnamese American poker player (born 1962)

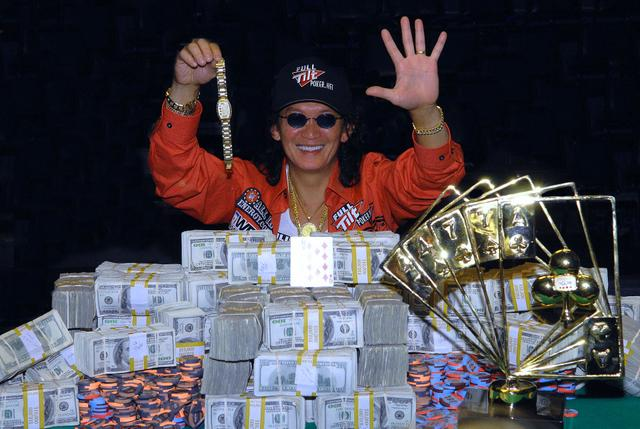
- Nguyen wins 50K HORSE 2008 World Series of Poker
- Nickname: Prince of Poker
- Born: Thuận B. Nguyễn; October 28, 1962 (age 64); Nha Trang, Vietnam

World Series of Poker
- Bracelets: 5
- Money finishes: 46
- Highest WSOP Main Event finish: Winner, 1998

World Poker Tour
- Title: 1
- Final tables: 8
- Money finishes: 21

European Poker Tour
- Title: None
- Final table: None
- Money finish: 1

Thuận B. "Scotty" Nguyễn (born October 28, 1962) is a Vietnamese-American professional poker player who is a five-time World Series of Poker (WSOP) bracelet winner, most notably as the winner of the 1998 World Series of Poker Main Event and the 2008 World Series of Poker $50,000 H.O.R.S.E. World Championship. He is the first player to win both the WSOP Main Event and $50,000 Players' Championship.

== Early life ==
Scotty Nguyen was born in Nha Trang, Vietnam. Due to the conflict in Vietnam, his mother sent him out of the country, first to Taiwan. He came to the United States at the age of 14 after finding a sponsor in Orange County, California. He was expelled from school for spending too much time in underground poker games. Nguyen attended dealer school at the age of 21 and was employed at Harrah’s poker room. While with Harrah's, he made about $150 a night and lost most of it playing $3–$6 stud. He described himself as a "fish" but wanted to gamble regardless.

His luck improved in 1985 when he was invited to Lake Tahoe to deal in a no-limit Hold’em tournament. He dealt all day and played cash games all night with the meager bankroll he brought with him. He built his bankroll to $7,000 and felt he was invincible. He returned to Las Vegas and gambled his bankroll up to $1 million. His name spread around Vegas and soon he began playing poker with Johnny Chan, Puggy Pearson, and David Grey. He purchased a Chevrolet Camaro for $17,000, a Corvette for $21,000, and a condominium for $60,000 all in cash. He lived in Caesars Palace and was winning $50,000 to $900,000 a night.

Bad habits plagued Nguyen; recreational use of marijuana, cocaine, and alcohol developed into full-scale addictions. After a costly losing streak, he ended up going broke. Nguyen was spared a room and $5,000 in cash.

== Poker career ==
Nguyen had to rebuild his bankroll after losing his million. His next success came at the 1997 World Series of Poker where he won the $2,000 Omaha 8 or Better event, netting a profit of over $150,000. Unfortunately, he lost this bankroll again and was completely broke shortly before the 1998 World Series of Poker. He had to play in a small satellite tournament which he did not even have enough money to buy into. Mike Matusow saw potential in him and decided to bankroll 1/3 of the buy-in. He went on to win the 1998 World Series of Poker and split 1/3 of the winnings ($333,333) with Matusow.

Nguyen is noted for playing emotionally. On the final hand of the 1998 World Series of Poker's Main Event, a full house was dealt on the table (8♣ 9♦ 9♥ 8♥ 8♠). He memorably said to his opponent Kevin McBride: "You call, it's gonna be all over, baby!" Previously in the game, with McBride all-in, Nguyen had quipped "It's gonna be all over if I read you right" before calling. However, his read hadn't been correct and McBride had won the pot, bringing him back in the game.

This time, McBride called and went all-in, saying: "I call. I play the board." Nguyen beat McBride with a better full house by holding 9♣ J♦. In the post-game interview, McBride admitted that he would not have called if not for Nguyen's quip. Main Event triumph in 1998 was followed immediately by tragedy—the next day, one of his brothers was hit by a car back home in Vietnam, and killed. For this reason, Scotty does not wear his 1998 WSOP championship bracelet. In the 2001 WSOP, he won two bracelets.

After making several World Poker Tour (WPT) final tables, Nguyen eventually won a WPT event in January 2006, defeating Michael Mizrachi heads-up in the fourth season Gold Strike World Poker Open when his A♠ Q♠ made a flush against Mizrachi's A♣ J♦ on the very first hand of heads-up round. With this WPT victory, he became one of only six people to win both the main event of the World Series of Poker and a World Poker Tour title. he was runner-up at the 2007 World Series of Poker in the seven card stud high low split eight or better event won by Eli Elezra. He stated after the event that he hadn't played cash games in over two years because he enjoys a friendly environment which is difficult in serious cash games. He also nearly made the final table of the 2007 World Series of Poker Main Event, finishing in 11th place out of a field of 6,358 and earning $476,926.

At the 2008 $50,000 World Series of Poker H.O.R.S.E. event, Nguyen, the eventual winner, exhibited what many have considered objectionable, and even rule-breaking behavior, including a soft-play in a hand with Erick Lindgren. In the broadcast of the prestigious event, he was shown drinking numerous alcoholic beverages while swearing and scolding others (including waiters/waitresses) at the final table, drawing criticism from commentators. Following the event (which Nguyen won), he issued an apology to his fans and stated that the event's editing depicted him unfairly. He also cited issues like exhaustion, frustration with the perceived gloating of Michael DeMichele, and pressure to succeed as reasons for his unconventional behavior. He later formally apologized to the fans in an interview, and said that he no longer blamed any other players for his behavior, and that there was no excuse for his behavior at the 2008 H.O.R.S.E. event. Since the incident, he has refused to drink alcoholic beverages during televised games.

In 2009, Nguyen won the inaugural LA Poker Classic $10,000 H.O.R.S.E World Championship at the Commerce Casino's annual LA Poker Classic Series, which earned him $260,485, and further cemented his reputation as one of the greatest masters of all variations of fixed limit poker.

As of 2023, his total live tournament winnings exceed $12,700,000. Of those winnings, $5,100,999 have come at the WSOP. Nguyen has also made appearances on the Ultimate Blackjack Tour playing Elimination Blackjack. He also made an appearance on Late Night with Conan O'Brien in April 2004.

In January 2012, Nguyen was named as team captain of the Expekt Poker pro team for EPT Deauville. The team also included Julian Kabitzke and Jack Salter as well as EPT London 3rd-place finisher Andre Klebanov.

In 2013, Nguyen was voted into the Poker Hall of Fame along with fellow WSOP Main Event winner, Tom McEvoy.

=== World Series of Poker bracelets ===
Year	Tournament	Prize (US$)
1997	$2,000 Omaha 8 or Better	$156,959
1998	$10,000 No Limit Hold'em World Championship	$1,000,000
2001	$2,500 Pot Limit Omaha	$178,480
2001	$5,000 Omaha Hi-Lo Split Eight or Better	$287,580
2008	$50,000 H.O.R.S.E. World Championship	$1,989,120
