= Susie Isaacs =

American poker player and author (born 1946)

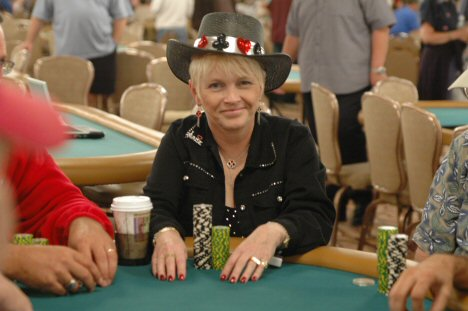
- Isaacs in the 2005 World Series of Poker
- Born: December 18, 1946 (age 79); Nashville, Tennessee, U.S.

World Series of Poker
- Bracelets: 2
- Money finishes: 13
- Highest WSOP Main Event finish: 10th, 1998

Susan J. Isaacs (born December 18, 1946, in Nashville, Tennessee) is an American professional poker player, who has been based in Las Vegas, Nevada, since 1986.

== Poker activity ==
Isaacs has finished in the money of six World Series of Poker (WSOP) ladies' events, and won the ladies' championship back-to-back in 1996 and 1997.

She finished tenth in the $10,000 WSOP no limit hold'em main event in 1998.

Isaacs was featured as a regular player in the Poker Royale: The James Woods Gang vs The Unabombers series. She is a regular contributor to Card Player Magazine.

As of 2010, her total live tournament winnings exceed $430,000.

Isaacs is also the author of two poker books:

- MsPoker: Up Close & Personal (August 25, 1999 - ISBN 0-9673459-0-1)
- 1000 Best Poker Strategies and Secrets (May 17, 2006 - ISBN 1-4022-0668-2)

Isaacs has one son and two stepchildren.

== World Series of Poker bracelets ==
Year	Tournament	Prize (US$)
1996	$1,000 Women's 7-Card Stud	$42,000
1997	$1,000 Women's 7-Card Stud	$38,000
