= Hal Kant =

American attorney and poker player (1931–2008)

- Nickname: Czar

World Series of Poker
- Bracelet: 1
- Money finishes: 12
- Highest WSOP Main Event finish: 21st, 1999

Harold Sanford "Hal" Kant (July 29, 1931 – October 19, 2008) was an entertainment industry attorney who specialized in representing musical groups. He was best known for his 35 years as principal lawyer and general counsel for the Grateful Dead, a position in the group that was so strong that his business cards with the band identified his role as "Czar".

== Early life ==
Hal Kant was born in the Bronx. He earned his law degree at the Harvard Law School. After graduation, he was hired as a clerk in the United States Court of Appeals for the Ninth Circuit in San Francisco, California.

== Music business ==
After starting to practice law on his own, he came to the realization that "the only attorneys in the music business were the attorneys for the record companies, and their job was to get as much money as they could for their company and leave as little as possible for the artists". Kant decided that "the other guys should have an attorney, too" and proceeded to help represent a series of artists including The Association, Captain Beefheart, Hot Tuna, Janis Joplin, New Riders of the Purple Sage, Sonny & Cher and Stevie Ray Vaughan. He turned down an opportunity to represent The Doors after the group demanded that he only represent them.

=== Grateful Dead ===
Kant became best known for his representation of the Grateful Dead, bringing the band millions of dollars in revenue, through his management of the band's intellectual property and merchandising rights. At Kant's recommendation, the group was one of the few rock 'n roll pioneers to retain ownership of their music masters and publishing rights. Kant's role with the band was so significant that his business cards with the band identified himself as "Czar".

Kant had plans to donate his legal business records to a proposed Grateful Dead museum to be built in San Francisco. This venture didn't come into fruition so that his experience in the historical development of contracts and business practices could be used as a resource by visitors.

== Poker ==
Kant won the $2,500 Pot Limit Omaha tournament at the 1987 World Series of Poker, earning a gold WSOP bracelet and $174,000. He was the runner-up in the $2,500 Limit Hold'em tournament at the 1990 World Series of Poker. Kant would often have members of the Grateful Dead cheering for him at poker tournaments.

During his poker career, Kant had total live tournament winnings exceeding $1,100,000. His 12 cashes as the WSOP account for $524,514 of those winnings.

== Death ==
He died at age 77 in Reno, Nevada on October 19, 2008, from pancreatic cancer. He was survived by his wife, Jesse, and his three sons, two stepchildren and five grandchildren.
