= Mel Judah =

Indian-born Australian poker player (born 1947)

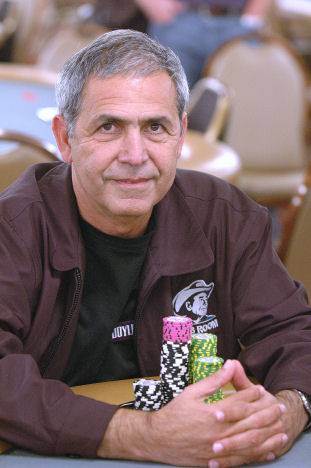
- Judah at the 2006 World Series of Poker
- Nickname: The Silver Fox
- Born: 8 October 1947 (age 79); Kolkata, India

World Series of Poker
- Bracelets: 2
- Money finishes: 36
- Highest WSOP Main Event finish: 3rd, 1997

World Poker Tour
- Title: 1
- Final tables: 2 (+1)
- Money finishes: 2

European Poker Tour
- Title: None
- Final table: None
- Money finish: 1

Mel Judah (born 8 October 1947 in Kolkata, India) is an Australian professional poker player, also known as "The Silver Fox" (a nickname he shares with fellow poker player Peter Costa). He learned poker at the age of 14 by watching his father play 5-card draw.

He has had several noticeable finishes in the World Series of Poker (WSOP) and the World Poker Tour (WPT). He won his first World Series of Poker bracelet in the 1989 in the $1,500 Seven Card Stud event. Judah won his second bracelet at the 1997 $5,000 Seven Card Stud event, defeating Vasilis Lazarou who has also won two WSOP bracelets in seven card stud tournaments.

He was also at the final table of the 1997 World Series of Poker main event, won by Stu Ungar, eventually coming in third place, and earning $371,000.

Judah also claimed the 2003 Legends of Poker title on the World Poker Tour, winning $579,375. He defeated a strong final table that included professional poker players Phil Laak, Farzad Bonyadi, Chip Jett, T. J. Cloutier, and Paul Phillips, whom he defeated in heads-up play to win the tournament.

He qualified for the final table of the 2006 Poker Million, finishing in fourth place. In January 2009, Judah won the $1,100 Omaha Hi-Lo tournament at the Aussie Millions in Melbourne Australia. In recollection of the respect Judah had generated within the game, he was asked to direct the new European Poker Masters tour in September 2006, Europe's first ever independent poker tour that was produced by the team behind The Poker Channel. Judah worked as a hairdresser for several years, which he believes has allowed him to understand players' psychology better. He now lives in Sydney, Australia.

As of 2009, his total live tournament winnings exceed $3,100,000. His 36 cashes at the WSOP account for $1,299,630 of those winnings.

Judah was an inaugural inductee into the Australian Poker Hall of Fame in 2009.

== World Series of Poker bracelets ==
Year	Tournament	Prize (US$)
1989	$1,500 Seven-Card Stud	$130,800
1997	$5,000 Seven-Card Stud	$176,000
