= Huck Seed =

American poker player (born 1969)

Huckleberry Seed
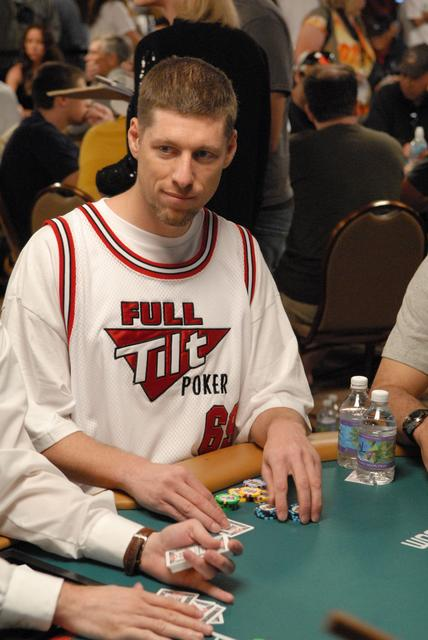
- Seed at the 2007 World Series of Poker
- Born: January 15, 1969 (age 57); Santa Clara, California, U.S.

World Series of Poker
- Bracelets: 4
- Money finishes: 54
- Highest WSOP Main Event finish: Winner, 1996

World Poker Tour
- Title: None
- Final table: None
- Money finishes: 4

Huckleberry ''Huck'' Seed (born January 15, 1969) is an American professional poker player best known for winning the Main Event of the 1996 World Series of Poker.

== Early life ==
Seed was born in Santa Clara, California, but grew up in Corvallis, Montana, where he attended Corvallis High School. He was a member of the 1987 Montana All-State basketball team. Seed was an electrical engineering student at California Institute of Technology and a member of Fleming House. He took a leave of absence in 1989, started playing poker, and never returned to college. Seed was a star player on Caltech's basketball team and is featured in the 2006 documentary Quantum Hoops.

== Poker career ==
Huck Seed played under the screen name “HuckleberrySeed” on the now defunct site Full Tilt Poker, and was a sponsored “red” poker pro on Full Tilt.

Seed won the 1996 World Series of Poker main event, which resulted in his second bracelet and the $1,000,000 first prize. He made the final table of the 1999 WSOP main event, but was eliminated in sixth place by eventual champion Noel Furlong.

In the 2003 World Series of Poker, Seed won his fourth career bracelet in a $3,000 Limit Razz tournament. He defeated Phil Ivey in heads-up play to win the bracelet.

In the 2007 Main Event, Seed finished 73rd out of 6,358 players.

Seed won the 2009 NBC Heads-Up Poker Championship, where he took the top prize of $500,000 and improved his overall record in the event to 18–4, an all-time best for win total. In addition, Seed became the only player to cash in every NBC Heads-Up tournament. Seed's streak ended in the 2010 tournament with his first round loss to eventual runner-up Erik Seidel.

In 2010, Seed won the World Series of Poker Tournament of Champions freeroll for $500,000.

On December 17, 2020, Seed was announced as one of the ten finalists for the 2020 induction into the Poker Hall of Fame. On December 30, 2020, Seed was announced as the 2020 inductee into the Poker Hall of Fame after receiving 76 votes ahead of Matt Savage (51 votes), Isai Scheinberg (45 votes), and Eli Elezra (30 votes).

As of February 2021, his total live tournament winnings exceed $7,600,000. He has four WSOP bracelets and cashed 54 times at the WSOP, accounting for $3,653,465 of his live tournament winnings.

== World Series of Poker bracelets ==
Year	Tournament	Prize (US$)
1994	$2,500 Pot Limit Omaha	$167,000
1996	$10,000 No Limit Hold'em World Championship	$1,000,000
2000	$1,500 Razz	$77,400
2003	$5,000 Razz	$71,500

== Prop bets ==
Seed has been involved in many "prop bets". He once made a $10,000 proposition bet with Phil Hellmuth and Konstantin Othmer that he could float in the ocean for 24 hours without touching the bottom. By bet rules, he was not allowed to bet more than an additional $15,000, and could settle the bet without attempting the feat for $5,000, which is what eventually happened. This bet has been incorrectly reported; Seed discussed it in a podcast.

Seed once took a six-figure bet that he could break 100 on a desert golf course four times in a day using just a five iron, sand wedge, and putter. He has also bet that he would be able to go an entire year without shaving.
