= 1982 World Series of Poker =

Series of poker tournaments

- Location: Binion's Horseshoe, Las Vegas, Nevada
- Dates: May 9 – 27

Champion
- (United States) Jack Straus

The 1982 World Series of Poker (WSOP) was a series of poker tournaments held at Binion's Horseshoe in May 1982.

== Events ==
There were 13 preliminary events at the 1982 World Series of Poker. Billy Baxter became the third player in WSOP history to win the first two events of a single World Series.

#	Date	Event	Entries	Winner	Prize	Runner-up	Results
1	May 9, 1982	$2,500 Ace to Five Draw	39	Billy Baxter (1/3)	$48,750	Bobby Baldwin (0/4)	Results
2	May 10, 1982	$10,000 Deuce to Seven Draw	19	Billy Baxter (2/4)	$95,000	Lou Axler	Results
3	May 11, 1982	$1,000 Seven Card Stud Split	88	Tom Cress (1/1)	$44,000	Clark Mantz	Results
4	May 12, 1982	$1,000 No Limit Hold'em	192	Jim Doman (1/1)	$96,000	Frank Henderson	Results
5	May 13, 1982	$500 Ladies' Seven Card Stud	64	June Field (1/1)	$16,000	Jackie Jean	Results
6	May 14, 1982	$1,000 Seven Card Razz	80	Nick Helm (1/1)	$40,000	Robert Turner	Results
7	May 15, 1982	$800 Mixed Doubles	44	David Sklansky (1/1) & Dani Kelly (1/1)	$8,800	Lanette Rocheleau & Gary Berland (0/5)	Results
8	May 16, 1982	$1,500 No Limit Hold'em	164	Ralph Morton (1/1)	$123,000	Joe King	Results
9	May 17, 1982	$1,000 Limit Hold'em	202	John Paquette (1/1)	$101,000	Sam Wilson	Results
10	May 18, 1982	$5,000 Limit Seven Card Stud	37	Chip Reese (1/2)	$92,500	Ken Flaton	Results
11	May 19, 1982	$1,000 Ace to Five Draw	77	Vera Richmond (1/1)	$38,500	Tim Jewett	Results
12	May 20, 1982	$1,000 Draw High	31	David Sklansky (2/2)	$15,500	Michael Conti	Results
13	May 21, 1982	$1,000 Seven Card Stud	112	Don Williams (1/1)	$56,000	Roger Moore	Results
14	May 22, 1982	$10,000 No Limit Hold'em Main Event	104	Jack Straus (1/2)	$520,000	Dewey Tomko (0/1)	Results

== Main Event ==
There were 104 entrants to the Main Event. This Main Event was the first to exceed 100 entries. Each paid $10,000 to enter the tournament, with the top nine players finishing in the money and the champion earning half of the prize pool. Doyle Brunson made the final table in pursuit of a record third Main Event title, but finished fourth. Jack Straus beat Dewey Tomko to win the 1982 title; earlier in the tournament, Straus had been down to one chip.

=== Final table ===
Place	Name	Prize
1st	Jack Straus	$520,000
2nd	Dewey Tomko	$208,000
3rd	Berry Johnston	$104,000
4th	Doyle Brunson	$52,000
5th	A. J. Myers	$52,000
6th	Dody Roach	$41,060

=== In The Money Finishes ===
Place	Name	Prize
7th	Buster Jackson	$20,800
8th	Sailor Roberts	$20,800
9th	Carl Cannon	$20,800

== The wristwatch ==
Due to early criticism that the bracelets were too feminine and that no male winners wore them, the WSOP replaced the bracelets with golden wristwatches in 1982. The wristwatches were unpopular, and, as a result, the bracelets were brought back in 1983.
