= 1986 World Series of Poker =

Series of poker tournaments

- Location: Binion's Horseshoe, Las Vegas, Nevada
- Dates: May 10 – 23

Champion
- (United States) Berry Johnston

The 1986 World Series of Poker (WSOP) was a series of poker tournaments held at Binion's Horseshoe.

== Events ==
There were 12 preliminary events at the 1986 World Series of Poker. 1984 WSOP Main Event winner Jack Keller finished runner-up in two preliminary events.

#	Date	Event	Entries	Winner	Prize	Runner-up	Results
1	May 10, 1986	$1,000 Limit Omaha	121	Jim Allen (1/1)	$48,400	Jack Keller (0/2)	Results
2	May 11, 1986	$2,500 Pot Limit Omaha (Rebuy)	67	David Baxter (1/2)	$127,000	Eddie Schwettman	Results
3	May 12, 1986	$1,500 No Limit Hold'em	302	Hamid Dastmalchi (1/1)	$165,000	Hans Lund (0/1)	Results
4	May 13, 1986	$500 Ladies' Seven Card Stud	82	Barbara Enright (1/1)	$16,400	Betty Carey	Results
5	May 14, 1986	$5,000 Deuce to Seven Draw with Rebuys	31	Ron Graham (1/1)	$142,000	Aubrey Day (0/2)	Results
6	May 15, 1986	$1,500 Limit Hold'em	320	Jay Heimowitz (1/2)	$175,800	Frank Henderson	Results
7	May 16, 1986	$1,000 Seven Card Razz	131	Tom McEvoy (1/3)	$52,400	Alma McClelland	Results
8	May 17, 1986	$1,000 Ace to Five Draw	173	J. B. Randall (1/1)	$69,200	Clifford Roof	Results
9	May 18, 1986	$1,000 Seven Card Stud Hi/Low Split	169	Tommy Fischer (1/2)	$73,600	Carl Lao	Results
10	May 19, 1986	$5,000 Seven Card Stud	40	Sam Mastrogiannis (1/2)	$80,000	Rick Greider	Results
11	May 20, 1986	$5,000 No Limit Ace to 5 Draw with Joker (Rebuy)	32	Mike Cox (1/1)	$118,000	Jack Keller (0/2)	Results
12	May 20, 1986	$1,000 Seven Card stud	196	Sam Mastrogiannis (2/3)	$78,400	David Chew	Results
13	May 21, 1986	$10,000 No Limit Hold'em Main Event	141	Berry Johnston (1/2)	$570,000	Mike Harthcock (0/1)	Results

== Main Event ==
There were 141 entrants to the main event. Each paid $10,000 to enter the tournament, with the top 36 players finishing in the money. 1985 World Champion Bill Smith made back-to-back Main Event final tables. Johnston, the eventual winner, finished third at the final table in 1985 when Smith won. Wendeen Eolis became the first female player to finish the main event in the money when she finished in 25th place.

=== Final table ===
Place	Name	Prize
1st	Berry Johnston	$570,000
2nd	Mike Harthcock	$228,000
3rd	Gary Berland	$114,000
4th	Jesse Alto	$62,700
5th	Bill Smith	$51,300
6th	Roger Moore	$39,900

=== In The Money Finishes ===
NB: This list is restricted to In The Money finishers with an existing Wikipedia entry.

Place	Name	Prize
8th	Jim Doman	$22,800
10th	Dewey Tomko	$12,500
11th	Don Williams	$12,500
13th	Jim Bechtel	$12,500
14th	Lyle Berman	$12,500
15th	David Baxter	$12,500
16th	Bobby Baldwin	$12,500
21st	Gabe Kaplan	$10,000
23rd	Buster Jackson	$10,000
25th	Wendeen Eolis	$10,000
26th	Johnny Moss	$10,000
28th	Ken Flaton	$7,500
34th	Artie Cobb	$7,500
