= List of poker playing card nicknames =

This list of poker playing card nicknames has some nicknames for the playing cards in a 52-card deck, as used in poker.

== Poker hand nicknames ==
The following sets of playing cards can be referred to by the corresponding names in card games that include sets of three or more cards, particularly 3 and 5 card draw, Texas Hold 'em and Omaha Hold 'em. The nicknames would often be used by players when revealing their hands, or by spectators and commentators watching the game. With TV and web broadcasting of Poker tournaments, nicknames became much more popular all over the world.

Card initials	Alternative names
♣ flush	Golf Bag (set of clubs), Puppy Feet, Puppy Prints (from the design of the club)
♦ flush	Well-Dressed, Decked Out
♥ flush	Valentine's Day, All My Hearts, Heart-breaker (if it loses)
♠ flush	Laborers, Digging Deep, In The Hole (if it loses)
J4o	Pure Bluff Catcher, Flat Tire
J4s	Bluff Catcher, NOT PURE
AA235, 2358K	Fibonacci
A3579, 3579J, 579JK	What Are The Odds
2357J, 357JK	All The Primes
2468T, 468TQ, 68TQA	Even Stevens
AAAAK	Knights of the Round Table, Monty Python and the Holy Grail
AAAA	Team Rocket, Thunderbirds, Musketeers
AAAKK	Windsor Castle, The Penthouse, Updown Court, The Pinnacle, Bran Castle (amongst some of the world's largest and/or most expensive buildings and/or mansions)
AAA	Athos, Porthos and Aramis
AAKK	Big Slick Did the Trick (a rhyme, if the appropriate two-pair hand is formed from the AK starting hand (aka Big Slick); poker professionals will tend to bet aggressively with this hand)
AAQQ	Aqua
AAJJ	Jackasses (play on "Jacks and Aces")
AA88	Dead Man's Hand
AKQJT	Broadway (off-suit), Royal Flush (suited)
A3A6	Austin 3:16 (after WWE wrestler Stone Cold Steve Austin)
A23	ABC
A4A42	Square root of 2
AA23	Princess Leia
A6A8T	Golden Hand (from the Golden Mean)
AK47	After the AK-47 assault rifle developed by Mikhail Kalashnikov
KKKK	Four Horsemen, Kings of Leon
AAAKKK	DUPLEX (Any two cards can be used. Basically two sets of trips. Instead of a 5-card hand called "Full House" you have a 6-card hand which makes a "bigger full house" or Duplex)
KKKAA	The Nativity (the Biblical story in which the Three Wise Men visit Joseph & Mary to witness Jesus Christ's birth)
KKKQQ	Buckingham Palace
KKK	Alabama Knight Riders, Three Wise Men, Christmas Special, Ku Klux Klan, Keane
KKQQ	Mommas and Poppas, ABBA, Double Date, "Aerosmith" (based on the song title, "Kings and Queens"), The Ice Breaker
KQJT9	Off-Broadway (off-suit), Hail to the King (suited)
QQQQK	Elvis in Vegas, Queer Eye for the Straight Guy
QQQQJ	Bachelor's Dream
QQQQ	Village People, Magnolias, Scrabble Player's Dream, The Joy Luck Club
QQQ	Six Tits, Daisy Hand
QAAAK	The Duck
QQ33	San Francisco waiters (Queens and Treys)
QJT98	Honeymoon in Vegas (if it wins, based on a scene from the movie of the same name)
JA55	Jackass, Jazz
JJJJQ	The Strip Club
JJJJ8	Riewoldt On A Roll (after AFL Richmond full-forward Jack Riewoldt)
JJJJ5	Neverland Ranch
JJJ55	Jackson Five
JJJ	"Hart, Schaffner and Marx"
JJ55	Rock 'n' Roll, Motown
JJ33	Hookers With Crabs
JT987	Convenience Store Straight, Honeymoon in Vegas (if it loses, based on a scene from the movie of the same name)
TTTT	Larry (after Larry Fortensky, Elizabeth Taylor's eighth husband), Shotgun
TTT	Thirty Miles of Bad Road, Elk River, Gilroy, Judge Bean, Judge Duffy, Judge Judy, Judge Wapner, San Jose to Gilroy (approximate distance in miles between the two cities), Dallas to Fort Worth (ditto), Judas (his pay was "thirty pieces of silver")
TT	Fingers n' Toes (ten of each), Dubs Dimes, Duff McKagan, Top Titties
TJAAT	Golden String
TT33	Hot Waitresses (Tens with treys)
TK42A	Star Wars, Stormtrooper (Why aren't you at your post?)
T8642	Rizlo, Scotch Straight
9988	Oldsmobile
9966	Dinner For Four, Dubs Sixtyniners
999	Extra Virgin (99 is "German Virgin")
888	Television Subtitles
77744	Sailing Rednecks
777	21, 21 Miles of Rough Road, Jackpot, Slot Machine
7733	Queens of the Stone Age (after their song 3's and 7's)
75432 (off-suit)	Kansas City, Sympathy Hand (it is the worst hand possible)
6677	Monzo Cosmo (after his song "Sixes and Sevens")
6667J	Devil's Convenience Store
666	The Devil, Lucifer, The Beast, Devil's Area Code, Kotch
65432	Rabbit, The World Trade Center Straight
555	Washington Monument, Pork Chop Sandwich, Movie Call (All bogus numbers start with "555")
5432A	First Street, Little Minnie, Little Wheel, Pup, Puppy, Spoke, Steel Wheel (suited), Steel Wheel Bike (suited), The Bicycle
4444A	Hole-In-One
4444	Yacht Club
444	Grand Jury
49	Full Cup (Joke from the TV Series Friends, where Chandler and Joey play "Cups")
36TJK	The Royal Sampler (from a joke on The Simpsons)
3333T	Teddy, EJ, Mr Football (after AFL/VFL Footscray/Western Bulldogs legend Ted Whitten), 1961 (if it loses)
3333	Forest, Four Trees, The Magic Numbers
3322	Socks and Shoes, Mits and Mites, Mites and Lice, Nits and Lice
3A4A5	Pi
27A82	Euler
2222	Mighty Ducks
222AA	Marksman
22233	Tent (smallest full house), Mites and Lice, Nits and Lice
222	Huey, Dewey, and Louie

== Texas hold 'em pocket card nicknames ==
The following is a list of nicknames for pairs of two playing cards, usually hole cards, used in poker derivatives such as Texas hold 'em and Omaha hold 'em poker. These nicknames are usually used by the player when announcing their hand or by spectators or commentators who are watching the game.

=== Ace higher card ===
Card initials	Alternative name	Explanation
AA
AA	Alan Alda	An alliteration, Alan Alda was the star of the television version of M*A*S*H
AA	Albert Anastasia	An alliteration, first mob boss killed gangland style in 1957
AA	American Airlines (A♥ A♠ or A♦ A♣)	So called due to the commercial airline's acronym and logo, AA (the aces are of different colors to mimic the AA logo)
AA	Apollo 11	So called due to it being the first mission to the moon while ace is considered 1, or because the hand "AA" means "11"
AA	Banditerna (A♠ A♣)	Swedish for "the Bandits"
AA	Batteries	AA like a AA battery commonly used in portable electronic devices
AA	Big Smoke	AA is a strong pre-flop favorite ("smokes") over Big Slick (AK) or any other two-card hand.
AA	Bullets	Looks like bullets, possibly a reference to the Dead Man's Hand, two pair of aces and eights, suggesting that Wild Bill drew a third bullet in the back, which filled his hand in death
AA	Eyes	Probably from snake eyes in dice
AA	Eyes of Texas	From the song, probably an elaboration on dice
AA	Flying Nazis	Probably because an A looks like a plane, and the Nazis had the most successful flying "aces" in their air force
AA	Joe Louis (A♠ A♣)	Two black eyes, what you will get in the ring if you fight Joe Louis
AA	Pocket Rockets	Looks like rockets
AA	Needles	Looks like needles
AA	Rocky Mountains	Looks like mountains
AA	Sharp Tops	Sharp on top, see also A4
AA	Snake Eyes	From dice snake eyes is the outcome of rolling the dice in a game of craps and getting only one pip on each die
AA	Squirrel	Probably named because the hand is "the nuts". Possibly also a reference to the phrase "Even a blind squirrel can find a nut once in a while"
AA	Sticks	Looks like sticks
AA	Teepees	Looks like teepees
AA	Two Pips	A pip is a mark indicating the suit or numerical value of a playing card
AA	Visine (A♥ A♦)	Two red eyes, it gets the red out
AK	Anna Kournikova	Initials; also looks good, but never wins.
AK	Annalise Keating	Initials;
AK	Barry Greenstein(A♦ K♦)	From 5th annual Jack Binion World Poker Open in Tunica MS, as per Hooter Huon
AK	Big Slick	It is a slippery hand that one can easily lose a fortune over
AK	Kalashnikov	Due to the name of a gun designed by Mikhail Kalashnikov, AK-47.
AK	Big Ugly (offsuit)	Imitating Big Slick, but "Ugly" if offsuit
AK	Exxon Valdez (A♠ K♠)	Since it has a lot of black in it.
AK	King Arthur	Named after the legendary British leader.
AK	Korean Airlines	Named after the South Korean national flag carrier, although its IATA code is KE.
AK	Mike Haven (A♦ K♦)	Mike played two pre-flops all-in in a row with these cards to win the final table, coming from behind
AK	Salt Lake Pair	No explanation found. The "pair" refers to the cards being well matched, rather than of equal value.
AK	Santa Barbara	Due to a big oil spill off Santa Barbara
AK	Walking Back to Houston	Gamblers who played this hand too strongly were often left with no getaway money. Other sources state that its name was derived because the old time poker players would play this hand so well that they would leave their opponents walking back to Houston
AQ	Antony & Cleopatra	A for Antony and Cleopatra his queen. Named after the lovers and Shakespearean works
AQ	Big Chick	Imitating Big Slick(AK)
AQ	Big Slut	Imitating Big Slick (AK). Hands involving Queens are often derogatory, especially if they do not win.
AQ	Doyle Brunson	In his book, Doyle said he would never play AQ, and busted out of the 2008 WSOP Main Event holding AQ offsuit.
AQ	Little Slick	Imitating Big Slick (AK)
AQ	Mrs Slick	Imitating Big Slick (AK)
AQ	Rocket Queen	A song made popular from Guns N'Roses
AJ	Armani Jeans	AJ is the acronym used by the brand Armani Jeans
AJ	The Unrare	n/a
AJ	Apple Jacks	Backronym of AJ
AJ	Ajax	Named after the foam cleaner due to the phonetic similarity between "Ajax" and "Ace-Jack", or "A-Jacks"
AJ	Blackjack	Named after the card game in which AJ (Or an Ace with a picture card or 10) is the highest possible hand
AJ	Foamy Cleanser	Ajax
AJ	Hijack	As in "High-Jack"
AJ	Jackass	Imitative of "Jack-Ace"
AJ	Trapasso	Likely to be named after the American football player A.J. Trapasso
AT	Bookends	2 ends of the highest straight
AT	Johnny Moss	It has been speculated that Johnny Moss is associated with this hand because he began playing poker at the age of 10
AT	Warthog	Reference to the A-10 Thunderbolt II attack aircraft, nicknamed the "Warthog"
A9	Rounders Hand	From the movie
A9	McDerment (A♣ 9♣)	A corruption of the last name of Mike McDermott, the character played by Matt Damon in the movie Rounders, whose fortune rode heavily on this hand.
A9	Jesus (Chris Ferguson)	Chris Ferguson beat T. J. Cloutier at the final hand of the 2000 WSOP Championship event holding A9 against TJ's AQ
A8	Dead Man's Hand	See Dead man's hand
A8	Asterix and Obelix	Inspired by characters from René Goscinny's The Adventures of Asterix. Asterix represents the Ace due to the matching initial with Obelix representing the 8 due to their similar shape.
A7	Slapshot	Nicknamed Slapshot as a hockey reference as sevens are sometimes called hockey sticks and aces are bullets
A7	The Sonnert	Named after poker player Bengt Sonnert for his success with it in the World Series of Poker Europe 2008
A6	Mile High Club	Airplane and sex (Aces are often nicknamed after planes due to their shape, "six" in German is pronounced as sechs similar to "sex")
A6	Tennessee Ernie Ford	Singer of Sixteen Tons
A5	High Five	An Ace is high, combined with a five gives us a high five
A5	Solver's Favorite Hand (suited)	Prevalent 3-bet bluff by poker solvers.
A4	Plane Crash	Aces are synonymous with flying (e.g., 'Flying Nazis', 'Pocket Rockets' and 'American Airlines') probably due to the shape of the 'A', a '4' is like an 'A', but with a missing 'wing', hence Plane Crash
A4	Stu Ungar	Ungar won the last of his three World Series of Poker Main Event titles in 1997 with this hand, making a straight.
A4	Fake Aces	Since a 4 looks a bit like an A, the A4 can be called fake aces.
A3	Ashtray	Imitates Ace-trey
A3	Baskin-Robbins	Nicknamed Baskin-Robbins because of their 31 different flavors of ice cream.
A3	Thrace	A portmanteau of "Three" and "Ace", also named after the historical and geographic area in southeast Europe Thrace
A2	Acey-Deucey	From the game Acey Deucy
A2	Riewoldt	Playing number of St. Kilda Captain, Nick Riewoldt (12)
A2	Hunting Season	Aces are known as bullets and twos are known as ducks, hence hunting season
A2	Little Slick	Imitation of 'Big Slick' (AK)
A2	Brutus	Imitates "et tu". From William Shakespeare's Julius Caesar. As Brutus stab Caesar, he exclaims “Et tu, Brute?”.
Ax	George Strait	Named after his Ace In The Hole Band and his song "Ace In The Hole"

=== King higher card ===
Card initials	Alternative name	Explanation
KK	Ace Magnets	Many players claim that they see an ace-high flop more often than they should while holding pocket kings; it is the only card that they do not want to see
KK	Brokeback	Named after the film that depicts the complex romantic and sexual relationship between two cowboys (KK also being called "Cowboys")
KK	Butchers of Baghdad	Reference to 2003 invasion of Iraq and the most-wanted Iraqi playing cards
KK	Cowboys	No explanation found. The nickname is probably given for a number of reasons, including the association between cowboys and playing poker, the similarity between the "K" of "King" and the "C" of "Cowboys" and both characters are male. It could also come from a common nickname of the King card - the "Cowboy".
KK	Elvis Presley	Named after the "King" of Rock and Roll
KK	Gorillas	From King Kong
KK	Gorillas in the Mist	From the movie starring Sigourney Weaver, a nickname taken from "King Kong" (Also KK)
KK	Kangaroos	Kangaroos are used on children's alphabet cards to illustrate a K
KK	Kevin Keegan	An alliteration
KK	King Kenny	An alliteration; the nickname of former Liverpool player Kenny Dalglish, who would soon be manager of Liverpool, Blackburn Rovers and Newcastle United
KK	Knights	An association with the feudal king images on the cards
KK	King Kong	An alliteration
KK	Kinkerbells	Courtesy of Vince Van Patten on Celebrity Poker
KK	Krispy Kreme	An alliteration
KQ	The Duck	A common name stemming from the fact that it looks like the hand says "Quack", leading to the conclusion that you are handling the animal known as a duck.
KQ	Tito Hand (suited)	If Tito loses
KQ	Ferdinand and Isabella	A Spanish King and Queen
KQ	Lucy and Ricky	Lucille Ball and Ricky "the King and queen of television"
KQ	Marriage (suited)	If it wins, comes from the game Pinochle
KQ	Mixed marriage (offsuit)	Comes from the game Pinochle
KQ	Othello (offsuit)	This is reference to Othello and Desdemona, the fated couple from William Shakespeare's play Othello. Possibly also a reference to 'Mixed Marriage'
KQ	Royal couple	A King and Queen
KQ	King of Queens	Popular American Sitcom starring Kevin James and Leah Remini.
KQ	Throne	As befits a royal couple.
KQ	Valentine's Day (K♥ Q♥)	A matched couple, both showing their hearts
KJ	Bachelor's hand (offsuit)	"Jack-King-Off"
KJ	Bill Fillmaff (offsuit)	The "signature hand" of "Bill Fillmaff", a character parodying poker professionals in general and Phil Hellmuth in particular, portrayed by Internet personality Kevin Bowen
KJ	Kalashnikov Jikita	Russian poker player Nikita Kalashnikov won $200 with this hand in an online poker room in 2020.
KJ	Harry Potter	Written by J.K. Rowling
KJ	Jacking Off (offsuit)	See also "Bachelor's hand".
KJ	Jamiroquai	A British band fronted by singer Jay Kay
KJ	Just kidding	Backronym of JK, from the textspeak "j/k" (see below)
KJ	Joking	'Jo' referring to the Jack; in textspeak, "j/k" is a pseudo-emoticon meaning "joking" or "just kidding"
KJ	Jackie Kennedy	Wife of JFK
KJ	The rookie	As said by Daniel Negreanu
KJ	Jordy Kooistra	Initials of Dutch poker player
KJ	King John	KJ
KJ	Kojak	Mimics KJack, thanks to the '70s crime drama starring Telly Savalas, who was himself a poker player and occasional participant in WSOP Main Events
KJ	Ralph Perry	2002 World Series of Poker Main Event finalist berated by Antanas Guoga for overplaying the hand
KJ	Starsky and Hutch	Named after the crime-fighting duo from the series of the same name
KJ	Tucson Monster	No explanation found
KT	Big Al	A reference to Wisconsin poker player "Big Al" Emerson
KT	Katie	Imitation of K-T
KT	Ken	A portmanteau of "King" and "Ten"
KT	Ike Turner	Beats QT (Tina Turner – see below)
KT	Woodcutter (offsuit)	Possibly from the legend of King Edward and the Woodcutter
K9	Bow-wow	From canine
K9	Canine	"K"-nine
K9	Dogs	From canine
K9	Fido	A derivative of canine
K9	Mongrel (offsuit)	From canine
K9	Mutt (offsuit)	From canine
K9	Pedigree (suited)	From canine
K9	Michael Vick	From canine, in reference to the former NFL QB's dog fighting conviction
K9	Rin Tin Tin	From Rin Tin Tin K9 cop
K9	The Doctor Who	K-9, the Robotic Dog from the British Television Series Doctor Who
K9	Sawmill	Byron 'Cowboy' Wolford says: Milton Butts and I were playing poker in Bryan, Texas, where they had a good game going on the weekends. We'd been playing for a couple of days when a hand came up in which I had a K-9. I made a pretty good hand with it, but lost the pot and went broke. As I was driving back home to Houston with Milton, feeling kind of disgusted about going broke with that K-9, we passed by a sawmill where a man was sawing logs in the lumberyard. "As hard as that guy works for his money, I'll bet he would never go broke with a K-9", I told Milton. And that's how K-9 got named "Sawmill." Some of those names are still going around – Doyle Brunson mentioned the sawmill hand in his book, Super/System
K8	Kate	A portmanteau of "King" and "Eight"
K8	Feast	What the 'King ate'
K8	Cheeseburger	What the 'King ate' the King being Elvis Presley
K8	Kokomo	Imitative
K7	Columbia River	The Columbia River is known for its salmon runs. "King Seven" sounds like "King Salmon"
K7	Kevin	Sounds like Kevin
K6	Kicks	Nicknamed "Kicks" (if Pig Latin is used) for phonetic reasons
K6	Solver hand	A common 3-bet and 4-bet defend by poker solvers
K5	Knives	A combination of "King" and "Five"
K5	Seattle Special/The Home Team	The nickname refers to Seattle's NBC affiliate, channel 5 with call letters KING Seattle TV channel 5 based in King County, Washington, United States. Their news team's slogan is "The Home Team"
K4	Core	A portmanteau of "King" and "Four"
K4	Fork	4K sounds like "Fork"
K4	Fork Off (offsuit)	4K sounds like "Fork" plus "Off" for offsuit
K4	Forking Idiot	From "Fork". Probably a suggestion that you would have to be an idiot to play the hand
K4	Oppression of the Masses	The answer to the question: "What is a king for?"
K3	Alaska Hand	From Alaskan King Crab
K3	Commander Crab	A derivative of King Crab
K3	Swedish Meatballs	SWEDES
K3	King Crab	3 looks like a crab
K3	Mortans Hand	Best hand he played
K3	Sizzler	The home of all-you-can-eat King Crab
K2	Big Fritz (suited)	An unconfirmed reference to German poker player Andreas Fritz
K2	Donald	A reference to Donald Duck, the "King" of ducks (since twos are also known as "ducks")
K2	The Tracey	Originated by a 1-2 no limit crusher at Parks poker room
K2	Hand of the Night	A reference created by Chris Hinst during his weekly poker night. Named because he kept getting this same hand.
K2	The Keegan	A reference to the worst poker face ever in the Sydney Music Poker scene.
K2	King Gnu (offsuit)	A reference to King Gnu.

=== Queen higher card ===
Card initials	Alternative name	Explanation
QQ	Lady Gaga	Queen of music & Queen of pop culture.
QQ	Calamity Jane	No explanation found, but the nickname is likely to come from Cowgirls the female equivalent of Cowboys (KK). Calamity Jane was also a friend of Wild Bill Hickok, a gunfighter who died during a poker game.
QQ	P-CO	The last two queens of England
QQ	Canadian Aces	Because Canadians revere the Queen
QQ	Canadian Rockets	Because Canadians revere the Queen
QQ	Four Tits	Vulgar
QQ	Hilton Sisters	Paris and Nicky Hilton
QQ	Anna Kournikova	Very pretty but seldom wins.
QQ	Ladies	Because they are the only female cards. Queens tend to have derogatory names, especially when they lose, so Ladies is more likely to be used when they win.
QQ	Pair of Wire Cutters	Dykes
QQ	Pocket Tubmans (Q♠ Q♣)	Reference to Harriet Tubman
QQ	Quiggities	Reference to Jiggities (see JJ below)
QQ	San Francisco Wedding	A gay reference
QQ	Siegfried & Roy	Two Queens
QQ	Snowshoes	Probably because they're the shape of a traditional snowshoe
QJ	Quack	Combination of Queen and Jack
QJ	Maverick	From the Maverick TV show theme song, "Livin' on jacks and queens. Maverick is a legend of the west"
QJ	Oedipus	an allusion to Sophocles' Oedipus the King, the ancient Greek tragedy in which Oedipus (the "J" in this pairing) unwittingly kills his father and marries his mother, Jocasta (the "Q")
QJ	Pinochle (Q♠ J♦)	The big hand in the game Pinochle
QJ	JQuery	JQuery never loses
QT	Aura hand	Hand which wins disproportionately often due to making the nut straight and strong bluff potential. Known to always hit.
QT	Cutie	For phonetic reasons
QT	Goolsby	Named for Everett Goolsby, well known Texas gambler. Crony of Doyle Brunson, Cowboy Wolford and Benny Binion
QT	Tarantino	Quentin Tarantino, film maker
QT	Q-Tip	A backronym of QT. A Q-tip is a cotton swab.
QT	Tina Turner	It always gets beat.
QT	Quint	Imitative
QT	Robert Varkonyi	In the 2002 WSOP, Varkonyi knocked out Phil Hellmuth and eventually won the final event with this hand
Q9	Quinine	"Queen Nine" sounds like "Quinine", an early anti malarial drug, from lowball
Q8
Q8	Snow and a Ho	8 is a snowman, Q is a ho
Q8	Frigid Bitch	From "Snow and a Ho"
Q8	Face Sitter	A vulgar reference to analingus, what the 'queen ate'
Q8	Bitch Called Hope	Tempting to try for a straight, but rarely succeeds
Q8	Kuwait	Nicknamed "Kuwait" for phonetic reasons
Q7	Computer Hand (offsuit)	From an apocryphal story that a computer proved that these were the most commonly occurring cards on the Flop. There is also a story of an early computer simulation in which Q7 was a break-even hand Nickname for the IBM Q7 (AN/FSQ-7) SAGE computer. This type of vacuum tube computer was physically the world's largest computer ever built.
Q7	Dike	a lady with a mullet
Q6	Arnold Palmer's ex-wife	Palmer was nicknamed the King.
Q6	Nesquik	From "quix"
Q6	Quix	Phonetic similarity.
Q6	Sad Ole Bess	A play on Queen Elizabeth I's other nickname, "The Virgin Queen," AKA the Cherry Queen
Q5	Granny Mae	If both spades, an old-time player, Granny=Queen, Mae=5th Month, some say Q5 spades was her favorite
Q4	Housework	A joking response to the question, "What's a queen for?"
Q4	Prince Maker	A joking response to the question, "What's a queen for?"
Q4	Shuli	Popularized in the notorious underground "Emergency Poker League" or "EPL", frequented by elite players of the Canadian circuit
Q3	Gay Waiter	'Queen' with a 'tray'
Q3	San Francisco Busboy	'Queen' with a 'tray'
Q3	Windsor Waiter	'Queen' with a 'tray'
Q2	Daisy	A reference to Daisy Duck, the "Queen" of ducks (since twos are also known as "ducks"). See also "Donald" – K2
Q2	Queen Liz	A reference to Queen Elizabeth II

=== Jack higher card ===
Card initials	Alternative name	Explanation
JJ	Brothers	Two similar looking males, i.e. brothers
JJ	Jiggities	Popularized by YouTuber Brad Owen. Likely a reference to Family Guy's Quagmire's catchphrase.
JJ	Fishhooks	They look like them, and because fish get beat with overpairs
JJ	Jar Jars	Jar Jar Binks is one of the most hated Star Wars characters, just as JJ is for many experienced poker players
JJ	Ice-JJ-Fish	Like the rapper, they rock
JJ	Jaybirds	Starts with J
JJ	Bowers	Named after the Jacks from the card game Euchre where jacks are the highest trumps and are called bowers, in turn from the German Bauer (literally, farmer)
JJ	Jonatan Johansson	An alliteration, former Finnish footballer and Charlton Athletic forward, nicknamed 'JJ' by the fans
JJ	John Juanda	An alliteration, John Juanda is an American professional poker player
JJ	Colostomy Bag	Vulgar, from "Pocket Jacks", 'Jacks' being a UK/Irish slang term for a toilet
JJ	Rentboys	Two young men, similar to pocket queen's "Prostitutes" nickname
JJ	Knaves Aplenty	Literally, a plethora of Jacks, a Knave being an alternative term for a Jack.
JJ	Kid Dy-no-mite	Signature expression of the character JJ from the TV show Good Times
JJ	One Eyed Jacks (J♠ J♥)	Both side views
JT	Justin Timberlake	Justin Timberlake's initials
JT	The Two Jakes	The movie sequel to Chinatown starring Jack Nicholson and Harvey Keitel
JT	Greek Passport	A Greek immigrant won with this to buy an Australian Residency
JT	John Terry	Named after the England Football Captain.
JT	T.J. Hooker	After the '80s action drama starring William Shatner
J9	Braggars	Jacks and nines are wild in the game of braggars
J9	T. J. Cloutier (J♣ 9♣)	T.J. flopped three straight flushes with this hand in one year
J8	Jeffrey Dahmer	He 'ate Jack', serial killer who ate his victims
J8	Jacket	Sounds like jacket
J7	Jack Daniels	Named after Jack Daniel's Old No. 7 Tennessee whiskey
J6	Coop Deville	Named after the legend of Houston, TX
J6	Kevin Cusick	Callout of J-6 and predicting a two pair before being dealt
J6	Insurrection	J6 short hand for January 6 United States Capitol attack.
J6	Jan 6	Similar to Insurrection.
J5	Jackson Five	Michael Jackson's childhood group
J5	Motown	Record label for Jackson Five
J4	The Robbi	Named after Robbi Jade Lew, who improbably called Garrett Adelstein with this hand on "Hustler Casino Live" to take down a $269,000 pot
J4	Austin Squatty	Named after John "Austin Squatty" Jenkins due to his penchant for raising and reraising with this hand
J4	Flat tire	What's a 'jack for'?
J4	Kid Grenade	After a poker dealer who when he played was "liable to go off at any moment"
J3	J Lo	As in "J-lo", "lo" meaning "low card" or perhaps the resemblance the 3 has to a derrière
J3	Lumberjack	A Tree and a Jack
J3	Minus Michael and Jermaine	Jackson 5 without two members, preferably clubs to resemble Afros.
J2	The Prince and the Pauper (suited)	After Mark Twain's novel set in 1547, which tells the story of two young boys who are identical in appearance: Tom Canty, a pauper who lives with his abusive father in Offal Court off Pudding Lane in London, and Prince Edward, son of King Henry VIII. They end up changing places.
J2	Heckle and Jeckle	Nicknamed Heckle and Jeckle after twin cartoon jaybirds (2 Jays) that first appeared on television in 1946 (Heckle and Jeckle were, in fact, magpies).
J2	Jack Shit	Popular English phrase referring to "nothing", in this context referring to the fact there is a Jack with the worst possible kicker and also something widely regarded among poker players as a "nothing" hand.

=== Ten higher card ===
Card Initials	Alternative name	Explanation
TT	Audi	Named after the Audi TT car
TT	Binary	In Binary, 1010 equals 10 (in decimal notation)
TT	Bo Derek	Actress from movie 10
TT	Dimes	A dime is a coin worth ten cents or one tenth of a United States dollar
TT	Dynamite	Comes from T and T sounding like the explosive TNT
TT	McDonald's	Named after the ten-piece McNugget
TT	Pocket Potatoes	The zero in 10 looks like a potato. Common Irish slang for a potato is a Tayto. Also an alliteration.
TT	Tension	Imitative
TT	TNT	Comes from T and T sounding like the explosive TNT
TT	Train Tracks	An alliteration
T9	Mobile Hand	Named after the "Text on 9 Keys" mode on mobile phones
T9	Countdown	Countdowns usually start at ten, nine...
T8	Tetris	Imitative
T7	Bowling Hand	The difficult Seven-ten split
T7	Daniel Negreanu (10♠ 7♠)	His favorite hand
T7	Split	A bowling reference, a seven-ten split
T6	Sweet Sixteen	Six and Ten. Should be mumbled with sarcasm as you fold it
T6	Filet-O-Fish	This hand looks good but in reality has no value
T5	Dime Store	From 5 & dime
T5	Homosexual	A gay reference, as you cannot make a straight with a ten and a five in your hand.
T5	Five and Dime	From nickname "Dimes" as a dime is a United States coin worth 10 cents. A Five and Dime is a type of variety store.
T5	Merfs	A draw poker game where tens and fives are wild
T5	Woolworths	The Five and Dime store chain
T4	Ex-Girlfriend	Named after a Las Vegas local's highschool girlfriend, because it sounds like the last name "fortin"
T4	Broderick Crawford	From 50s "Highway Patrol", who said "10-4" into radio
T4	CB Hand	Ten-four is CB radio language for OK
T4	Convoy	From the old trucker song, ten-four good buddy
T4	Good Buddy	Old trucker radio language, ten-four is CB language for OK
T4	Over and Out	Two-way radio language for end of conversation, ten-four is radio language for OK
T4	Roger That	Two-way radio language for OK, ten-four is also radio language for OK
T4	Truckers' Hand	Following the CB radio craze of the '70s, for the same reasons as "Broderick Crawford"
T4	The Trucker	From CB radio
T3	Kitchies	The T3 must be offsuit; refer to Dipthrong's kitchen for origin
T3	Fast Connection	Refers to the T3 telecommunications connection
T3	Alexisdg8	A Canadian player from Quebec won his first tournament with this hand
T3	Hot Waitress	Ten with a tray (trey)
T2	Terminator 2	T2 is abbreviation for Terminator II
T2	Whirlygig	Contemporary
T2	Doyle Brunson (a.k.a. Texas Dolly)	Doyle "Texas Dolly" Brunson twice won the WSOP in 1976 and 1977 turning these hole cards into full [houses]

=== Nine higher card ===
Card initials	Alternative name	Explanation
99	Barbara Feldon	Played Agent 99 on Get Smart
99	Hitlers	Derogatory, derived from the German word Nein.
99	German Virgin	What a German Virgin would say: "Nein, nein!"
99	Phil Hellmuth (9♣ 9♠)	He won the 1989 WSOP with this hand
99	Red Balloons (9♦ 9♥)	From the 1980s song 99 Red Balloons by Nena
99	Popeyes	Look like Popeye's arm muscles
99	Pothooks	The 9 looks like a traditional pothook
99	Wayne Gretzky	Hockey player's uniform number
98	Oldsmobile	The Olds 98 car
97	Persian Carpet Ride	A term Antonio Esfandiari coined for his favorite hand, making joking reference to his Persian heritage. He used the term on Poker After Dark, apparently after his friends teased him about the hand, no further explanation given. However, Esfandiari also used the term on the commentary track of the World Poker Tour Season 2 DVD set, so the term dates back to at least 2004.
96	The Dirty	69, sexual reference
96	Big Lick	69, sexual reference to Big Slick
96	Breakfast of Champions	69, sexual reference
96	Dinner For Two	69, sexual reference
96	Good Lover	69, sexual reference
96	Happy Meal	69, sexual reference
96	Mighty Meal	69, sexual reference, 96 suited, stronger than a Happy Meal (see above)
96	Big Love	69, sexual reference
96	Joe Bernstein	A gambler from the 30s, a sharp road gambler. Joe was known as a dapper dresser at the poker table
96	Jaka Šubic	Slovenian improvisational comedian and poker player.
96	Percy (offsuit)	69, sexual reference
96	Prom Night (suited)	If suited because they wear a tux on prom night, 69 sexual reference
96	Burger and a Grape Snow Cone	Reference to Alan Jackson's "Chattahoochee"
95	Betty Hutton	From a version of stud with nines & fives wild
95	Dolly Parton	From the movie 9 to 5
95	Hard Working Man	Works 9 to 5
94	Joe Montana	49ers quarterback, borrowed from 92 Montana Banana; when he was benched, the joke was 49 unsuited
94	Lost World Series	Refers to the lost baseball World Series of 1994. Could also refer to the fate of a player who plays these cards incorrectly.
94	San Francisco	49 refers to San Francisco's Football team, the 49ers, which in turn refers to men of the 1849 gold rush in the Sierra Nevada mountains east of San Francisco
93	Jack Benny	For years Jack Benny claimed to be 39 years old
93	The Sandy	Sandy Dunlop became 2013 champion of the Black Cat Poker tournament with these hole cards
92	Montana Banana	It is a widely asserted myth that this nickname originates from the legalization of poker in Montana by Proposition 92. However, poker was legalized in Montana by the Card Games Act, 23-5-311. The nickname is referring to how it is more likely that bananas will grow in chilly Montana than that this hand will make money. Other sources suggest it is Joe Montana's quarterback rating
92	Twiggy	From the 70s model's top measurement of 29

=== Eight higher card ===
Card initials	Alternative name	Explanation
88	Dawg Balls/Doggie Balls	Looks like them
88	Piano Keys	There are 88 keys on a piano
88	Rocket 88	Big car was Olds 98, smaller car called Olds 88
88	Racetracks	Goes round and round like a race track
88	Snowmen	Looks like two snowmen
88	Lindros	Eric Lindros wore Jersey #88
88	Dale Jr.	Dale Earnhardt Jr. drove the #88 car in NASCAR
88	Two Fat Ladies	Looks like two fat ladies taken from bingo
88	Lacey	Looks like shoelaces tied in a bow
88	Octopuses/Octopi	An octopus has eight tentacles
88	Pretzels	Looks like two pretzels
88	Wurlitzer	The number of keys on the Wurlitzer electric piano
88	Time Travel	The time travel speed (88 mph) used in the Back to the Future trilogy
88	Infinity on the Side	Looks like two infinity symbols on their side
88	Ovechkin	A reference to the hockey player Alexander Ovechkin, who wears jersey #8.
87	RPM	The very first record format was a 10-inch disc that spun 78 revolutions per minute
87	Tahoe	From the seven/8 variation of holdem
87	Crosby	A reference to the hockey player, #87 Sidney Crosby.
86	Pooch	Bill Puccio swears these cards win every time
86	Jagr	Named after hockey player Jaromír Jágr, who wore number 68 his entire career.
86	Rick James	Named after Singer/Celeb Rick James, who died on 8/6.
86	Eubie	If you play these, you be broke
86	Henry Bowen	A Texas gambler
86	Maxwell Smart	From TV show Get Smart, Agent 86, see also 99
86	Pacheco Nuts (offsuit)	The California Grand, in Pacheco is right alongside Highway 680.
85	The Hamilton	This hand is so named after a well known Scottish player. It is of course not a powerful hand but can on occasion make a well disguised straight. Its main function, though, is to tilt other players.
85	Chad	Football player Chad Ochocinco wears uniform number 85. Ochocinco, translated literally from Spanish, means "Eight Five."
84	Big Brother	From George Orwell's book titled 1984
84	Boris Backhand	From boris89 winning 217,752.13 on this hand
84	Orwell	Author of the book titled 1984
83	Most Feared Hand in Hold'em	A tongue in cheek reference to it being the third worst hand in poker
83	Raquel Welch	Raquel Welch still claims to be 38
83	The Octocrab	Looks like a crab, which has 8 legs. Popularized by YouTuber Ben Deach.
83	Luigi	The closest hand to the Mario hand
82	Tadpole	An answer to the statement, "What the duck ate."
82	The Ball Buster	This hand is not technically the worst but it is still horrible.
82	Mario	A reference to the ball buster

=== Seven higher card ===
Card initials	Alternative name	Explanation
77	Axes	Looks like them
77	Scythes	A seven looks like a scythe
77	Len Goodman	Judge from Strictly Come Dancing, whose catchphrase was "Seven!"
77	Candy Canes	Looks like them
77	Hockey Sticks	Looks like them
77	Mullets	Because of the hair style, flat in front, long in back
77	Saturn	Saturn VII rocket
77	Sunset Strip	From the title of the television series 77 Sunset Strip
77	Walking Sticks	Looks like them
77	Lucky Linus Mealey	Named after notorious London poker player.
76	Trombones	From the song 76 Trombones, from the musical The Music Man and its film adaptation
76	Union Oil	Union 76 gas stations
75	007 (7♠ 5♠)	Reference to James Bond's winning hand in the 2006 movie Casino Royale
75	Heinz	The H. J. Heinz Company's advertising slogan of "57 varieties"
75	Pickle Man	A reference to Heinz of 57 sauces fame
75	The Corrigan	A reference to the one and only Josh Corrigan, an icon of the Newcastle poker community, also coined the “Newcastle Nuts” by Novocastrian locals
75	Pistol	A reference to the pistol made by Fabrique Nationale the FN Five-seven
74	Double Down	A Double Down is a player decision in Blackjack, in which you are betting that your hand can be won with one more card. A player may only double down on his first two cards dealt. When a player doubles down, the original bet is automatically doubled (a second chip appears) and the player receives one more card. Since there are more 10 point cards than any other, doubling down is most worthwhile on an 11-point hand, 7-4 being worth 11 points.
74	Ghost Dog	Almost undoubtedley from the film Ghost Dog: The Way of the Samurai starring Forest Whitaker, probably due to the fact that G and D are respectively the seventh and fourth letter of the alphabet.
74	Kalashnikov	Most likely refers to the AK-47 and AK-74 assault rifles designed by Mikhail Kalashnikov
73	Dutch Waiter	Sven with a Tray
73	Joe Hachem	Joseph Hachem won the 2005 World Series main event holding 7♣ 3♠ when the flop came 4♦ 5♦ 6♥
73	Swedish Busboy	Sven with a Tray, see also San Francisco Busboy and Dutch Waiter
72	Beer Hand (offsuit)	Named because it is either time for a beer; or because if one wins with this, one should buy the other players a beer; or only a person full of beers would play this hand. The beer hand has the worst chance of winning of all possible pocket cards in a full table playing Texas Hold'em. It is slightly better in short-handed games because the fact that it is not possible to make a straight or flush without hitting four appropriate community cards is less important in short-handed games.
72	Hammer (offsuit)	In poker, the hammer is defined as the last position (the cut-off), particularly when heads-up. The 72 offsuit got the nickname as a result of a competition to play it on the hammer, and has been adopted into legitimate Oxford Dictionary poker parlance.
72	W.H.I.P. (offsuit)	Worst Hand In Poker

=== Six higher card ===
Card initials	Alternative name	Explanation
66	Boots	Looks like them
66	Cherries	Nicknamed because of similarity to the shape of the number 6
66	Kicks	Get your kicks on Route 66
66	Route 66	The road from Chicago to LA
65	Bus Pass	UK bus passes are often available to citizens over the age of 65 (although this age varies)
65	Ken Warren	Won with this hand at World Series of Poker
64	Billion Dollar Hand	In reference to The $64,000 Question
64	Gilchrist	Named after the Australian cricketer Adam Gilchrist for his ability to always hit 6's and 4's
64	Arlo	Royal Arlo if suited, named after Arlo Payne, a long time regular poster to the usenet newsgroup rec.gambling.poker
63	Blocky	Another nickname of Broomcorn from the story in Doyle Brunson's Super/System. He used to play 63 as an ambush hand
63	Jimmy Summerfield (offsuit)	Kevin Larsen says: One time while playing with Jimmy, she [the dealer] had noticed that trash cards were hitting the flop quite often especially 6's and 3's, so Jimmy wins a huge pot after she told him to play the 63 off he was holding. Thus was born the "Jimmy Sommerfield". Once, while playing down on the coast, a player wins a big pot. He slaps his cards down on the table and announces "I've got a Jimmy Somerfield!". Then Jimmy says "Let me introduce myself", and shows the player his ID. I was dealing a four eight game one night to Jimmy, a few other dealers and a bunch of locals. A fairly loose game. The pot is capped six or eight way action. Jimmy announces preflop "I've got my hand !" Nobody believes him when the flop comes 6 6 3 He gets four or five callers to the river. Monster Pot!
63	Spanish Inquisition	Nickname given to this starting hand by Iron Men of Poker. Refers to the fact that "Nobody Expects the Spanish Inquisition", a reference to the classic Monty Python quote.
62	Aimsworth	Byron 'Cowboy' Wolford says: I was in San Antone playing a big no-limit game with Jack Straus, Sen. Red Berry, and a bunch of the old-time players. Jack was on top of you all the time, but in full ring games, he wasn't as tough as he was shorthanded or heads up. He had two aces and I took the flop with a 6-2. A deuce came on the flop, he made a bet, and I called him. Off came another deuce on the turn, he bet, and I called him. A third deuce came on the river and we got all in. When I showed him that 6-2, he said, "What the hell were you drawing at there, Cowboy?" "Oh, I wasn't drawing at nothing", I answered. "Just aiming at another deuce. I guess I'm Aimsworth."

=== Five higher card ===
Card initials	Alternative name	Explanation
55	Sammy Hagar	After Hagar's song, "I Can't Drive 55"
55	Nickels	Five cents per nickel
55	Presto	There is debate as to where this term originated. The most commonly accepted source of the nickname is that many years ago, before Rec.gambling was split into several groups, followers of the group who were blackjack players were fond of saying "Presto!" as they turned up a 21. This became a sign of recognition of fellow travelers. Around this time (circa 1991), the World Rec Gambling Poker Tournament (WRGPT), of which the first few were played slowly over email, came into being. During WRGPT2 (1992-1993), the attribution of pocket fives as the "Presto Hand" was made by the player Howard Simonson, after using pocket fives to knock several players out of the tournament. Consequently, the term stuck among the rec.gambling posters, and has become a common poker term today. There is also suggestion that the hand won more often than it should due to a computer glitch. However, there is a counter-argument that there used to be a club in London called the Presto Club. The address was 55 Victoria Street, London. Therefore, whenever someone was dealt 55 in hold'em, they would say they were dealt "Presto", because of the club's street address. When English players played events worldwide, the word spread, and it caught on everywhere.
55	Snakes	Looks like two snakes
55	Speed Limit	55 MPH, the maximum speed limit in the US in the National Maximum Speed Law era
54	Colt 45	The gun, and the beer
54	Jesse James	Because the outlaw was rumored to have been shot by a .45
54	Moneymaker	Winning hand of Chris Moneymaker, 2003 World Series of Poker Main Event champion
53	Bully Johnson	A poker player that Doyle Brunson described as being "laid back and quiet". He played this hand after being raised preflop and caught a straight on the flop to beat another guy's trip aces
53	Juggernaut	Well-known Magic: The Gathering artifact card with power of five and toughness of three.
52	Bomber	B-52 bomber
52	Pick-up	As in 52 card pick up
52	Quarter	25 cents
52	Two Bits	25 cents
52	Ivey	Named for one of the greatest bluffs on High Stakes Poker, when Phil Ivey raised pre-flop with a five-deuce offsuit, was re-raised by Lex Veldhuis with KJ suited, and then went all in causing Lex to fold his hand.

=== Four higher card ===
Card initials	Alternative name	Explanation
44
44	Sailboats	The fours look like sails on a boat.
44	Obama	Barack Obama is the 44th President of the United States
44	Dark Force (4♠ 4♣)	Dark Side Of The Fours
44	Darth Vader (4♠ 4♣)	The two black fours are the "Dark Side of the Fours"
44	Diana Dors	Her top measurement
44	The Harley (4♠ 4♣)	Favorite hand of BCP pro Harley Quin after flopping quads with these hole cards: "The Fours are strong with this one..."
44	Luke Skywalker	"May the Fours be with you." Usually referenced with one black four, and one red four.
44	Princess Leia (4♥ 4♦)	An extension of the Luke Skywalker and Darth Vader reference
44	Fourtale	n/a
44	Magnum	The .44 cal gun
44	Midlife Crisis	Likely to be named after the approximate age of the average midlife crisis (actually given as 46)
43	Waltz	In music, waltzes are always in 3/4 meter
43	Books	"What's a tree for?"
42	Jack Bauer	The main character in 24
42	Lumberman's Hand	A common piece of lumber is a two by four
42	The Principle	Canadian Politician, Steven Hicks' favorite hand. He always said he played it On Principle
42	The Answer	In The Hitchhiker's Guide to the Galaxy, the computer decided that the answer to everything in the universe was 42

=== Three higher card ===
Card initials	Alternative name	Explanation
33	Crabs	Because a 3 looks like it has pincers
33	Lucky Dragon	Favorite Chinese hand that "never loses"
33	Treys	"Trey" dates back to the 14th century, and is a name for a card or a die showing three points; originally from Old French treis.
32	Can of Corn	This nickname likely comes from baseball where a "Can of Corn" is an easily caught fly ball. Supposedly comes from a general store clerk reaching up and dropping a can from a high shelf. Likely to be analogized due to the ease in which 32 is caught since it is the lowest possible non-hand (22 being a pair).
32	Little Pete	No explanation found
32	The Diaper	"The Dirty Diaper" if offsuit. Held by Nick Rigby in the 2021 World Series of Poker Main Event
32	Michael Jordan	From his jersey number (23)
32	Ham Sandwich	Originated in Atlantic Canada for a 32 off suit. 32 suited is a ham sandwich with cheese.
32	Polish Big Slick	A bad Polish joke mimicking AK Big Slick
32	The Nut Low	In this instance 'nut' meaning 'most' rather than 'best', low hand (i.e., the lowest hand)
32	Hooter Hand (suited)	Named after poker dealer Houth "Hooter" Houn who played this hand as aggressively as AK.
32	Little Brick	Low cards that never hit the flop.
32	Crubs (if clubs)	From the card game Hearts

=== Pocket Twos ===
Card initials	Alternative name	Explanation
22	Desmond	Named after Archbishop Desmond Tutu
22	Ducks	From deux, the French word for two, also a two looks like a duck, also used in bingo
22	Deuces	From Old French for two
22	Quack Quack	From two little ducks, also bingo reference to the number 22
22	Swans/Swarovskis	Looks like Swarovski Crystal swans
22	Richard Nixon	From the photo of Nixon getting on a helicopter giving two victory signs

=== One-eyed royals ===
The phrase one-eyed royals is jargon referring to the three face cards showing only one eye: the Jack of Spades (J♠), Jack of Hearts (J♥) and King of Diamonds (K♦). The faces depicted on these three cards are shown in profile, resulting in only one eye being visible. The variant form "one-eyed Jacks" excludes the King of Diamonds. The cards are also sometimes referred to as "one-eyed Jacks and the Man with the Axe", which relates to the King of Diamonds being the only one to bear an axe instead of a sword. These cards are frequently designated as wildcards in home games of draw poker. Other such phrases include "Suicide King", denoting the King of Hearts (K♥) bearing a sword through his head, and 'Bedside Queen', denoting the Queen of Spades (Q♠) bearing a staff that resembles a wooden bedpost. The name "Allergic Queen" also refers to the Queens facing away from the flowers they hold.

== See also ==
- List of poker-related topics
- Glossary of poker terms
- Poker-hand rankings
