= 1987 World Series of Poker =

Series of poker tournaments

- Location: Binion's Horseshoe, Las Vegas, Nevada
- Dates: May 1 – 17

Champion
- (China) Johnny Chan

The 1987 World Series of Poker (WSOP) was a series of poker tournaments held at Binion's Horseshoe.

== Events ==
There were 11 preliminary events at the 1987 World Series of Poker.

#	Date	Event	Entries	Winner	Prize	Runner-up	Results
1	May 1, 1987	$1,000 Ace to Five Draw	216	Bob Addison (1/1)	$96,400	Don Williams (0/2)	Results
2	May 2, 1987	$5,000 Deuce to Seven Draw with Rebuys	37	Billy Baxter (1/5)	$153,000	Joe Petro	Results
3	May 3, 1987	$1,000 Limit Omaha	180	T. J. Cloutier (1/1)	$72,000	Robert Turner	Results
4	May 4, 1987	$5,000 Seven Card Stud	71	Artie Cobb (1/2)	$142,000	Don Williams (0/2)	Results
5	May 5, 1987	$1,000 Seven Card Stud	259	Jim Craig (1/1)	$103,600	Al Anderson	Results
6	May 6, 1987	$2,500 Pot Limit Omaha	91	Hal Kant (1/1)	$174,000	Lyle Berman	Results
7	May 7, 1987	$1,500 Limit Hold'em	342	Ralph Morton (1/2)	$189,000	Jack Keller (0/2)	Results
8	May 8, 1987	$1,000 Seven Card Stud Split	233	Joe Petro (1/1)	$93,200	Gene Fisher (0/1)	Results
9	May 9, 1987	$5,000 Seven Card Razz	163	Carl Rouss (1/1)	$65,200	Mark Mitchell	Results
10	May 10, 1987	$500 Ladies' Seven Card Stud	84	Linda Ryke-Drucker (1/1)	$16,800	Barbara Putterman	Results
11	May 11, 1987	$1,500 No Limit Hold'em	313	Hilbert Shirey (1/1)	$171,600	Lee Wosk	Results
12	May 12, 1987	$10,000 No Limit Hold'em Main Event	152	Johnny Chan (1/2)	$625,000	Frank Henderson	Results

== Main Event ==
There were 152 entrants to the main event. Each paid $10,000 to enter the tournament, with the top 36 players finishing in the money. The 1987 Main Event was Johnny Chan's first of back-to-back World Championships. Dan Harrington finished in sixth place. He would later go on to win the 1995 WSOP Main Event.

=== Final table ===
Place	Name	Prize
1st	Johnny Chan	$625,000
2nd	Frank Henderson	$250,000
3rd	Bob Ciaffone	$125,000
4th	James Spain	$68,750
5th	Howard Lederer	$56,250
6th	Dan Harrington	$43,750

=== In The Money Finishes ===
NB: This list is restricted to In The Money finishers with an existing Wikipedia entry.

Place	Name	Prize
8th	Mickey Appleman	$25,000
9th	Jack Keller	$18,750
11th	Jay Heimowitz	$12,500
12th	Hamid Dastmalchi	$12,500
14th	Humberto Brenes	$12,500
15th	Don Williams	$12,500
16th	Rod Peate	$12,500
17th	Puggy Pearson	$12,500
18th	Howard Andrew	$12,500
21st	Bobby Baldwin	$10,000
22nd	Mike Hart	$10,000
26th	Johnny Moss	$10,000
32nd	Berry Johnston	$7,500
34th	Artie Cobb	$7,500
35th	Mori Eskandani	$7,500
