= Tom McEvoy =

American poker player and author (born 1944)

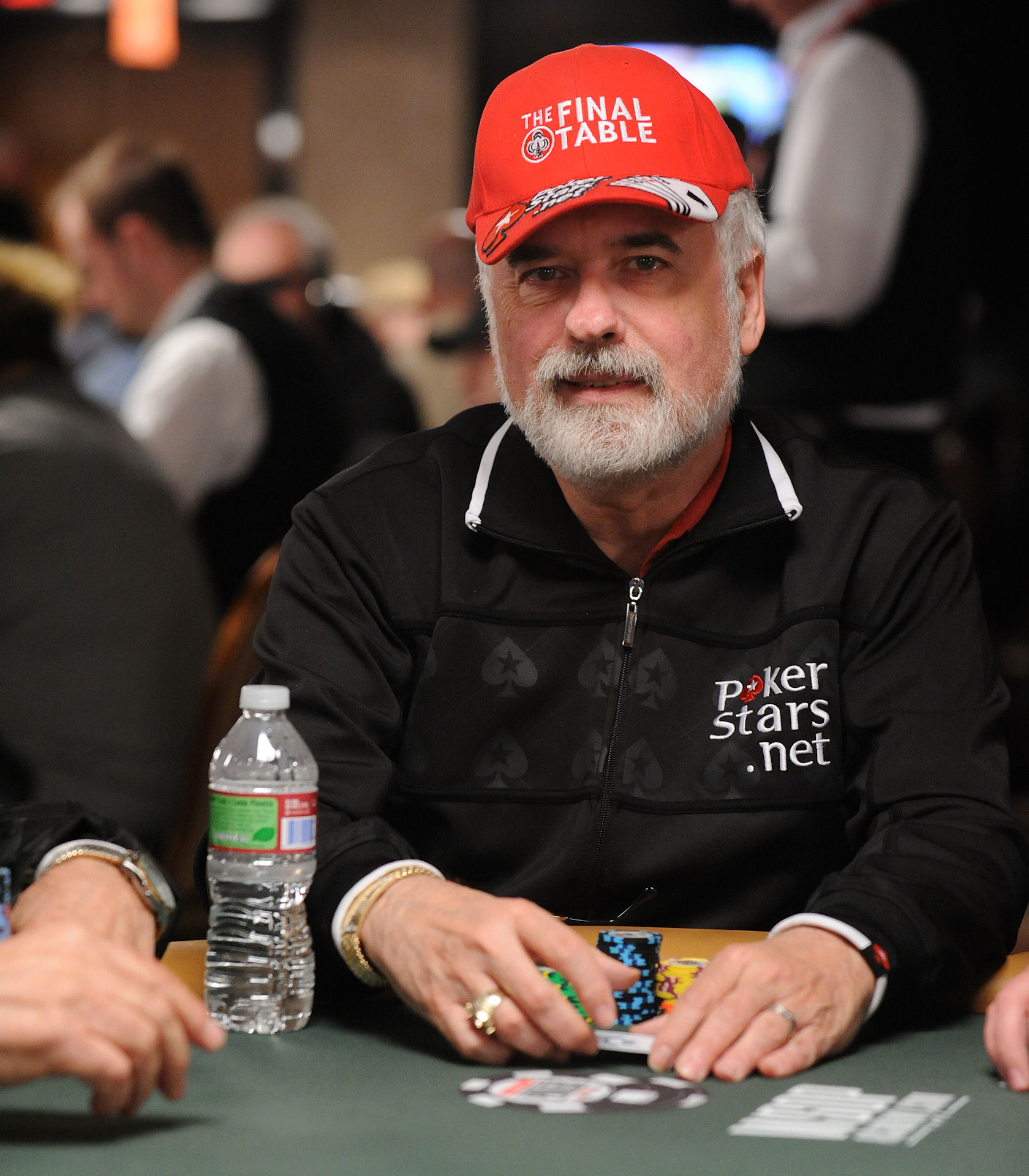
- McEvoy at the 2010 World Series of Poker
- Born: Thomas McEvoy; November 14, 1944 (age 82); Grand Rapids, Michigan, U.S.

World Series of Poker
- Bracelets: 4
- Money finishes: 56
- Highest WSOP Main Event finish: Winner, 1983

World Poker Tour
- Title: None
- Final table: 1
- Money finishes: 4

European Poker Tour
- Title: None
- Final table: None
- Money finishes: 2

Thomas K. McEvoy (born November 14, 1944) is an American professional poker player, author and member of the Poker Hall of Fame, 2013 inductee. He is best known for winning the 1983 World Series of Poker Main Event.

== Early life ==
McEvoy was born and raised in Grand Rapids, Michigan. He worked as an accountant, but after being laid off, he began playing poker full-time in 1978. He first learned the game at the age of five and often got in trouble for playing it during grade school.

== Poker career ==
McEvoy's first cash in the World Series of Poker (WSOP) came in 1982 when he finished sixth in the $1,000 Razz event. He won his first WSOP bracelets the following year winning the $1,000 Limit Hold'em event, defeating Irish professional poker player Donnacha O'Dea heads-up to win the tournament, and later winning the 1983 WSOP Main Event. He was the first Main Event winner to earn his buy-in through a single table satellite tournament. His 7 1/2 hour long heads-up matchup with Rod Peate was the longest heads-up battle in WSOP history before being surpassed at the 2006 WSOP during the $50,000 H.O.R.S.E. by Chip Reese and Andy Bloch.

Since his two bracelet wins in 1983, McEvoy has gone on to win two additional WSOP bracelets. He won the Razz tournament in 1986, defeating Alma McClelland, and a Limit Omaha tournament in 1992, defeating 1986 WSOP Main Event champion Berry Johnston. Having played in 36 WSOP Main Events, he has cashed in the Main Event three additional times since 1983 finishing 371st for $34,636 in the 2006 WSOP, 644th for $18,714 in the 2016 WSOP and 430th for $29,625 in the 2018 WSOP.

In March 2005, McEvoy won the third ever Professional Poker Tour event beating a field of pros-only at the Bay 101 casino. He defeated a final table that included fellow WSOP bracelet winners, Toto Leonidas and Hoyt Corkins.

McEvoy is staunchly opposed to smoking, and in 1998, he helped organize the first smoke-free poker tournament. Despite initial reluctance, the event drew a large number of players, confirming the viability of non-smoking tournaments. In 2002, McEvoy persuaded Becky Binion Behnen to make the WSOP a non-smoking event in exchange for giving her son, Benny Behnen, poker lessons.

McEvoy has authored or co-authored over a dozen books on poker with other players such as T. J. Cloutier, Brad Daugherty, Don Vines, Linda Johnson, Dag Palovic and Max Stern. He is a former columnist for CardPlayer Magazine and was a Team Pro representative at PokerStars.com from 2003-2011.

On May 31, 2009, McEvoy won the WSOP's first and only Champions Invitational, outlasting 19 other former Main Event champions. He defeated 2002 world champion, Robert Varkonyi in heads-up play to win the tournament. First prize was a classic 1970 Corvette and the inaugural Binion Cup, presented by Jack Binion, in honour of his father, Benny Binion, the founder of the WSOP and Binion's Horseshoe Casino, the original home of the World Series of Poker.

As of October 2021, his total live tournament winnings are $3,087,477. His 56 cashes at the WSOP account for $1,391,462 of those winnings. Since his first WSOP cash in 1982 he has at least one WSOP cash in 30 of the last 39 years, the most recent are 2 cashes in the 2021 WSOP.

McEvoy resides in Las Vegas and has three children.

=== World Series of Poker Bracelets ===
| Year | Tournament | Prize (US$) |
|---|---|---|
| 1983 | $1,000 Limit Hold'em | $117,000 |
| 1983 | $10,000 No Limit Hold'em World Championship | $540,000 |
| 1986 | $1,000 Razz | $52,400 |
| 1992 | $1,500 Limit Omaha | $79,200 |

== Bibliography ==
- How to Win at Poker Tournaments (1985) ISBN 0-89746-055-3
- Championship No-limit and Pot-limit Hold'em: On the Road to the World Series of Poker (1997) ISBN 1-884466-31-1
- Championship Stud: 7-Card Stud, Stud/8, Razz (1998) ISBN 1-884466-25-7
- Championship Omaha: Omaha High-Low, Omaha High and Pot-Limit Omaha (1999) ISBN 1-884466-27-3
- Championship No Limit & Pot Limit Hold 'Em (The Championship Series) (2004) ISBN 1-58042-127-X
- Championship Tournament Poker (The Championship Series) (2004) ISBN 1-58042-123-7
- Beat Texas Hold'em (2004) ISBN 1-58042-150-4
- Championship Hold'em Tournament Hands: A Hand By Hand Strategy Guide to Winning Hold'em Tournaments (The Championship Series) (2005) ISBN 1-58042-149-0
- Win Your Way Into Big Money Hold'em Tournaments: How to Beat Casino and Online Satellite Poker Tournament (The Championship Series) (2005) ISBN 1-58042-147-4
- Championship Omaha (The Championship Series) (2005) ISBN 1-58042-154-7
- How to Win No-Limit Hold'em Tournaments (2005) ISBN 1-58042-160-1
- Championship Hold'em Satellite Strategy (The Championship Series) (2007) ISBN 1-58042-213-6
- No-Limit Texas Hold'em: The New Players Guide to Winning Poker's Biggest Game (2009) ISBN 1-58042-233-0
- Championship Table: At the World Series of Poker (1970-2007) (The Championship Series) (2009) ISBN 1-58042-229-2
