= Pifer =

Pifer may refer to:

== People ==
- Dan Pifer (born c. 1972), American football coach
- Lisa Pifer (born 1967), American bass player and song writer
- Rose Pifer, World Series of Poker champion
- Steven Pifer (born 1953), former United States Ambassador to Ukraine

== Other ==
- Pifer Mountain, summit in West Virginia
