= Poker in 1988 =

This article summarizes the events related to the world of poker in 1988.

== Major tournaments ==
=== 1988 World Series of Poker ===
Johnny Chan wins the main tournament for the second time in a row.

=== 1988 Super Bowl of Poker ===
Stu Ungar wins the main event, becoming the first player to win the super bowl a second time.

== Poker Hall of Fame ==
Doyle Brunson and Jack Straus are inducted.

== Deaths ==
- August 17: Jack Straus (Born on June 16, 1930)
