= Dody Roach =

American poker player (1937–2004)

World Series of Poker
- Bracelets: 2
- Money finishes: 10
- Highest WSOP Main Event finish: 6th, 1982

Felix D. "Dody" Roach (May 3, 1937 – September 7, 2004) was an American poker player from Corpus Christi, Texas, who won two bracelets at the World Series of Poker.

== Career ==
Roach won his first bracelet at the 1981 WSOP in the $1,000 No Limit Hold'em tournament. In 1982, he made the final table of the $10,000 Main Event. Roach finished in 6th place, earning a $41,060 cash prize in the event which was won by Jack Straus.

Roach won his second bracelet in 1996, in the $1,500 Limit Omaha event. In the heads-up play, he defeated multi bracelet winner Men Nguyen "the Master" to win the bracelet and $102,600 prize.

His total tournament cashes were $490,649. His 10 cashes at the World Series of Poker accounted for $283,734 of that total.

In 2004, Roach died at age 67.

== World Series of Poker Bracelets ==
Year	Tournament	Prize (US$)
1981	$1,000 No Limit Hold'em	$81,000
1996	$1,500 Limit Omaha	$102,600
