= David Sklansky =

American poker player and author (1947–2026)

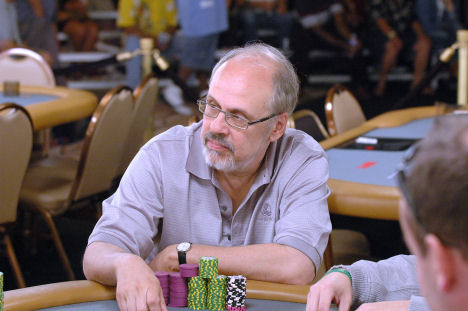
- Sklansky at the World Series of Poker
- Nickname: The Mathematician
- Born: December 22, 1947; Teaneck, New Jersey, U.S.
- Died: March 23, 2026 (aged 78); Las Vegas, Nevada, U.S.

World Series of Poker
- Bracelets: 3
- Money finishes: 23
- Highest WSOP Main Event finish: 27th, 1988

World Poker Tour
- Title: None
- Final table: 1
- Money finishes: 3

David Bruce Sklansky (December 22, 1947 – March 23, 2026) was an American professional poker player and author. An early writer on poker strategy, he was known for his mathematical approach to the game. His key work The Theory of Poker presents fundamental principles on which much later analysis is based.

== Early life and education ==
Sklansky was born on December 22, 1947, in Teaneck, New Jersey, where he was also raised. He graduated from Teaneck High School in 1966. Sklansky attended the University of Pennsylvania, but dropped out before graduation. He returned to Teaneck and passed multiple Society of Actuaries exams by the age of 20, and worked for an actuarial firm.

== Poker career ==
Sklansky wrote and contributed to fourteen books on poker, blackjack and gambling in general. He has won three World Series of Poker bracelets, two in 1982 ($800 Mixed Doubles with Dani Kelly, and $1,000 Draw Hi) and one in 1983 ($1,000 Limit Omaha Hi). He also won the Poker By The Book invitational event on the 2004 World Poker Tour, outlasting a table which included Phil Hellmuth, Mike Caro, T. J. Cloutier, and Mike Sexton, and then finally overcoming Doyle Brunson.

As of 2015, his live tournament winnings exceeded $1,350,000.

=== World Series of Poker bracelets ===
Year	Tournament	Prize (US$)
1982	$1,000 Draw High	$15,500
1982	$800 Mixed Doubles (with Dani Kelly)	$8,800
1983	$1,000 Limit Omaha	$25,500

== Death ==
Sklansky died in Las Vegas from heart failure on March 23, 2026, at the age of 78.

== Publications ==
Sklansky authored or co-authored 14 books on gambling theory and poker. Most of his books are published by Two Plus Two Publishing. His book cover art often features hand guns. His 1976 book Hold'em Poker was the first book widely available on the subject of hold'em poker. It is through these books that he popularized the concept of Sklansky Bucks (now often referred to as luck-adjusted winnings), which are used by professional poker players to this day.

- Hold'em Poker. Gambler's Book Club. 1976. ISBN 978-0911996678.
- Brunson, Doyle; et al. (1979). "Seven-card stud high-low split". Super/System.
- Sklansky on Razz. 1983. ISBN 0-87019-050-4.
- Sklansky on Poker: Including a Special Section on Tournament Play, and Sklansky on Razz. Two Plus Two Publishing LLC. 1994. ISBN 1-880685-06-X.
- Sklansky, David; Malmuth, Mason (1997). How to Make $100,000 a Year Gambling for a Living. Two Plus Two Publishing LLC. ISBN 1-880685-16-7.
- Getting the Best of It. Two Plus Two Publishing LLC. 1997. ISBN 1-880685-04-3.
- Poker, Gaming, & Life. Two Plus Two Pub. 1997. ISBN 1-880685-17-5. "Collection of articles that have appeared in Card Player and similar specialist magazines during the 1990s"
- Sklansky, David; Malmuth, Mason (1999). Hold'em Poker for Advanced Players, 21st Century Edition. ISBN 1-880685-22-1.
- Sklansky, David; Malmuth, Mason; Zee, Ray (1999). Seven Card Stud for Advanced Players. Two Plus Two Publishing LLC. ISBN 1-880685-23-X.
- Sklansky Talks Blackjack. Two Plus Two Pub. 1999. ISBN 1-880685-21-3.
- The Theory of Poker
- Tournament Poker for Advanced Players. Two Plus Two Pub. 2002. ISBN 1-880685-28-0.
- Miller, Ed; Sklansky, David; Malmuth, Mason (2004). Small Stakes Hold 'em: Winning Big with Expert Play. Two Plus Two Publishing LLC. ISBN 1-880685-32-9.
- Sklansky, David; Miller, Ed (2006). No Limit Hold 'em: Theory and Practice. Two Plus Two Publishing LLC. ISBN 1-880685-37-X.
- DUCY? Exploits, Advice, and Ideas of the Renowned Strategist. Two Plus Two Publishing LLC. 2010. ISBN 978-1880685488.
