= 1988 World Series of Poker =

Series of poker tournaments

- Location: Binion's Horseshoe, Las Vegas, Nevada
- Dates: May 5–16

Champion
- (China) Johnny Chan

The 1988 World Series of Poker (WSOP) was a series of poker tournaments held at Binion's Horseshoe between May 5, 1988, and May 21, 1988.

== Events ==
There were 11 preliminary events at the 1988 World Series of Poker. Johnny Moss became the first player to win nine career bracelets. No other player would reach nine career bracelets until the 2003 WSOP.

#	Date	Event	Entries	Winner	Prize	Runner-up	Results
1	May 5, 1988	$1,500 Limit Hold'em	400	Val Carpenter (1/1)	$223,800	Jack Keller (0/2)	Results
2	May 6, 1988	$1,500 No Limit Hold'em	330	Russell Gibe (1/1)	$181,800	Hans Lund (0/1)	Results
3	May 7, 1988	$2,500 Pot Limit Omaha	111	Gilbert Gross (1/1)	$181,000	Hugh Todd	Results
4	May 8, 1988	$5,000 Seven Card Stud	79	Thor Hansen (1/1)	$158,000	David Heyden	Results
5	May 9, 1988	$1,000 Limit Omaha	228	David Helms (1/1)	$91,200	Don Williams (0/2)	Results
6	May 10, 1988	$1,500 Seven Card Stud Split	206	Lance Hilt (1/1)	$123,600	Joe Petro	Results
7	May 11, 1988	$500 Ladies' Seven Card Stud	85	Loretta Huber (1/1)	$17,000	Ester Rossi	Results
8	May 12, 1988	$1,500 Seven Card Stud	217	Merrill Hunt (1/1)	$130,200	Johnny Moss (0/8)	Results
9	May 13, 1988	$5,000 Deuce to Seven Draw	38	Seymour Leibowitz (1/1)	$157,500	Chip Reese (0/2)	Results
10	May 14, 1988	$1,500 Ace to Five Draw	194	Johnny Moss (1/9)	$116,400	Richard Chase	Results
11	May 15, 1988	$1,000 Seven Card Razz	192	Don Williams (1/3)	$76,800	Art Youngblood	Results
12	May 16, 1988	$10,000 No Limit Hold'em Main Event	167	Johnny Chan (1/3)	$700,000	Erik Seidel	Results

== Main Event ==
There were 167 entrants to the main event on May 16, 1988. Each paid $10,000 to enter the tournament, with the top 36 players finishing in the money. The 1988 Main Event was the second consecutive World Championship for Johnny Chan. The final hand that featured Chan against Erik Seidel would be featured in the 1998 movie Rounders. Jim Bechtel made the final table and finished in sixth place. He would later win the 1993 World Series of Poker Main Event.

=== Final table ===
Place	Name	Prize
1st	Johnny Chan	$700,000
2nd	Erik Seidel	$280,000
3rd	Ron Graham	$140,000
4th	Humberto Brenes	$77,000
5th	T. J. Cloutier	$63,000
6th	Jim Bechtel	$49,000

=== In The Money Finishes ===
NB: This list is restricted to In The Money finishers with an existing Wikipedia entry.

Place	Name	Prize
9th	Jesse Alto	$21,000
15th	Jay Heimowitz	$12,500
18th	Roger Moore	$12,500
20th	Mike Hart	$10,000
23rd	Ken Flaton	$10,000
26th	Don Williams	$10,000
27th	David Sklansky	$8,750
28th	John Spadavecchia	$8,750
31st	Jack Keller	$7,500
32nd	Chip Reese	$7,500
33rd	Phil Hellmuth	$7,500
