= Dag Palovič =

Slovak writer and poker player (born 1975)

- Nickname: Lucky D
- Born: 4 January 1975 (age 51); Bratislava, Czechoslovakia

World Series of Poker
- Bracelet: None
- Money finishes: 5
- Highest WSOP Main Event finish: 37th, 2010

World Poker Tour
- Title: None
- Final table: None
- Money finish: None

European Poker Tour
- Title: None
- Final tables: 2
- Money finishes: 6

Dag Palovič (born 4 January 1975) is a Slovak writer, TV presenter and former professional poker player known for being a member of PokerStars Team Pro between 2011 and 2013 due to achieving relative success on the international scene. His results include making two European Poker Tour (EPT) final tables in 2007, 37th place finish at the 2010 World Series of Poker Main Event and winning French Heads-Up Championship in 2010. Palovič amassed close to $1,000,000 during his poker career. He is also an author of the first Slovak book on poker titled Ako sa stať poker pro ('How to become a poker pro') co-authored by 1983 World Series of Poker champion Tom McEvoy and after his poker career Palovič shifted to writing, first publishing a crime novel Two-dollar Crimson Bill 2013 before moving to self-help genre with the 2018 publication of the book Eye-Opener.

== Poker career ==
Palovič first became notable in late 2007 by making a final table at €4,700 EPT Prague Main Event, being first Slovak player to do so. Palovič was eliminated in 7th place winning $137,151. He repeated this success five months later with his second final table appearance, this time at main event of EPT San Remo with another 7th-place finish, this time taking home $176,628. Since then, Palovič cashed at the EPT three time, including a 14th place in EPT Grand Final held in Madrid in May 2011, for which he earned $89,053.

In summer 2008 Palovič also made his first in the money finish at the World Series of Poker, finishing 69th in $5,000 No Limit Hold'em event. Next year, Palovič added three more cashes with one of them being his 120th place at the 2009 WSOP Main Event, being the first and as of October 2010 only player from Slovakia to cash in this tournament. He managed to break his own record a year later with a 37th-place finish and prize of $206,395.

As of October 2012, Palovič's 5 cashes at the WSOP account for $268,826 of his $909,405 career winnings.

Outside of EPT and WSOP he is also known for winning €5,000 Internationaux de France de Heads Up in March 2010 with a first prize of $84,570 as well as being author of book Ako sa stať poker pro co-authored by Tom McEvoy.

== Other activities ==
Before poker, Palovič was known mostly as a TV personality, being host of several TV shows as well as playing a few roles in Slovak movies in mid-80s. As a host of music programmes during 1996–2004 he has done interviews with celebrities such as Lauryn Hill, Jamiroquai, Wyclef Jean, Lenny Kravitz, Kate Ryan or Tiziano Ferro.

== Personal life ==
Palovič is single with no children. During 2006–2009, he was engaged to Slovak top model Zuzana Gregorová. He is a member of Mensa.
