= Bob Ciaffone =

American poker player and author (1940–2022)

- Nickname: The Coach
- Born: December 10, 1940; Brooklyn, New York, U.S.
- Died: May 13, 2022 (aged 81); Saginaw, Michigan, U.S.

World Series of Poker
- Bracelet: None
- Money finishes: 7
- Highest WSOP Main Event finish: 3rd, 1987

Bob Ciaffone (December 10, 1940 – May 13, 2022) was an American poker player, author of Robert's Rules of Poker.

Ciaffone finished third in the 1987 World Series of Poker (WSOP) $10,000 no limit Texas hold 'em main event, winning $125,000. In that same year, he finished fourth in the WSOP $2,500 pot limit Omaha hold 'em event.

Ciaffone was the president of the Michigan Chess Association in 2003, is the author of four books on poker and two books on chess, and has been awarded the Life Master title by both the United States Chess Federation and the American Contract Bridge League.

He was a delegate to the 2008 Democratic National Convention.

Ciaffone's total live tournament winnings were $347,106.
