= June Field =

American poker player

World Series of Poker
- Bracelet: 1
- Money finishes: 2
- Highest WSOP Main Event finish: None

June Field is a World Series of Poker bracelet winner, having won the 1982 $400 Ladies - Limit 7 Card Stud event.

The Women's Poker Hall of Fame inductee founded Card Player Magazine in 1988, and later, Card Player Cruises, eventually selling both to Linda Johnson. She would go on to start Poker Digest, which later merged with Casino Player Magazine.

== World Series of Poker Bracelets ==
| Year | Tournament | Prize (US$) |
|---|---|---|
| 1982 | $400 Ladies - Limit 7 Card Stud | $16,000 |
