= Loretta Huber =

American poker player

World Series of Poker
- Bracelet: 1
- Money finish: 1
- Highest WSOP Main Event finish: None

Loretta Huber was a World Series of Poker (WSOP) champion in the 1988 $500 Ladies - Limit 7 Card Stud event.

In addition to her WSOP victory, she had two other major live cashes. Her total tournament winnings exceed $21,000.

== World Series of Poker bracelets ==
Year	Tournament	Prize (US$)
1988	$500 Ladies - Limit 7 Card Stud	$17,000
