= List of playing-card nicknames =

Some playing cards have common nicknames. Some are generic while some are specific to certain card games; others are specific to patterns, such as the court cards of the Paris pattern and the Tell pattern for example, which often bear traditional names. This list does not contain names that are specific to poker or in schafkopf as it would overwhelm the list and make it difficult to identify non-poker names. Poker nicknames are listed separately here. Schafkopf nicknames are listed separately here.

== Single cards ==
The following is a list of nicknames used for individual playing cards of the French-suited standard 52-card pack. Sometimes games require the revealing or announcement of cards, at which point appropriate nicknames may be used if allowed under the rules or local game culture.

Card	Any suit	Clubs ♣	Spades ♠	Diamonds ♦	Hearts ♥
King (K)	Cowboy, Monarch	Alexander	David	Julius Caesar, Man with the Axe, One-Eyed King	Charlemagne, Charles, Suicide King
Queen (Q)	Stenographer	Argine	Black Lady, Black Maria, Calamity Jane, Pallas Athena, Molly Hogan	Rachel	Helen of Troy, Judith
Jack (J)	Boy, Bower, Fishhook, Jackson, Jake, Johnny, Knave, Valet, Nibs or Heels	Lancelot, Pam	Ogier	Hector, Roland, Laughing Boy	La Hire
Ten (10)				Big Cassino	
Nine (9)	Neener, Nina Ross, Niner, Pothook			Curse of Scotland, Scourge of Scotland	
Eight (8)	Pusher, Snowman				
Seven (7):	Fishhook, Salmon			Beer card	
Six (6)	Sax				Grace's Card (Note: The Six of Hearts is known as loyalty at the risk of death or Grace's Card. This is because in 1689 emissaries of William of Orange called on John Grace, Baron of Courtstown, with an invitation to join the army of the usurper. On a playing-card lying on the table beside him he scrawled a contemptuous refusal: "Tell your master I despise his offer, and that honor and conscience are dearer to a gentleman than all the wealth and titles a prince can bestow". Baron Grace was loyal to King James II of England, and risked being shot or hanged for his refusal to give up. One hundred years later, in Kilkenny, the six of hearts was still known as 'Grace's Card'.)
Five (5)	Fever, Nickel, Pedro				
Four (4)	Sharp Top, Sore Spot, Sailboat	Devil's Bedpost			
Three (3)	Crab, Trey				
Two (2)	Deuce, Duck		Little Cassino, The Curse of Mexico		
Ace (A)	Bull, Bullet, Rocket, One Spot, Seed, Sharp Top	Basto, Clover, Puppy Foot	Death Card, Spadille, Tax Card	Pig's Eye	
Joker (★)	Best Bower				

Nicknames also exist for cards not from the standard 52-card pack:

- King (K):
  - King of Hearts (K): Maxi
- Ober (O):
  - Ober of Hearts (O): Hermann Gessler
  - Ober of Bells (O): Stüssi d. Flurschütz
  - Ober of Leaves (O): Ulrich v. Rudenz
  - Ober of Acorns (O): Wilhelm Tell
- Unter (U):
  - Unter of Hearts (U): Kuoni d. Hirt
  - Unter of Bells (U): Itell Reding
  - Unter of Leaves (U): Walter Fürst
  - Unter of Acorns (U): Rudolf Harras
- Seven (7):
  - Seven of Acorns (7): Spitz ("Point")
  - Seven of Coins (7 ): Sette Bello ("beautiful seven")
  - Seven or Six of Bells (7 or 6): Weli
- Deuce (A): Ace, Sau ("sow")

== Collective names ==
- King, Queen, Jack: Coat Card, Court Card, Face Card, Figure, Rembrandt, Royal Card
- Ace, King, Queen, Jack: Honour
- 10, 9, 8, 7, 6, 5, 4, 3, 2, Ace: Pip card, Spot card, Numeral, Spotter
- King of Diamonds, Jack of Spades, and Jack of Hearts (K♦ J♠ J♥): One-Eyed Royals
- Jack of Spades and Jack of Hearts (J♠ J♥): One-Eyed Jacks
- Jack of Clubs and Jack of Diamonds (J♣ J♦): Two-Eyed Jacks
- King, Queen (same suit): Marriage
- Two cards same suit in sequence for Patience (game): Marriage

== See also ==
- Glossary of card game terms
- Glossary of poker terms
- List of poker playing card nicknames
- Schafkopf language
