= Linda Ryke-Drucker =

American poker player

World Series of Poker
- Bracelet: 1
- Money finishes: 7
- Highest WSOP Main Event finish: None

Linda Ryke-Drucker was a World Series of Poker champion in the 1987 $500 Ladies - Limit 7 Card Stud event.

As of 2008, her total WSOP tournament winnings had exceeded $58,212.

== World Series of Poker bracelets ==
| Year | Tournament | Prize (US$) |
|---|---|---|
| 1987 | $500 Ladies - Limit 7 Card Stud | $16,800 |
