= 1985 World Series of Poker =

Series of poker tournaments

- Location: Binion's Horseshoe, Las Vegas, Nevada
- Dates: May 4 – 17

Champion
- (United States) Bill Smith

The 1985 World Series of Poker (WSOP) was a series of poker tournaments held at Binion's Horseshoe.

== Events ==
There were 13 preliminary events at the 1985 World Series of Poker. Amarillo Slim won his first bracelet in 11 years, setting a record for longest time between bracelets at the time. Following the Main Event, there was one more tournament.

#	Date	Event	Entries	Winner	Prize	Runner-up	Results
1	May 4, 1985	$2,500 Ace to Five Draw	40	Dick Carson (1/2)	$50,000	Ron Graham	Results
2	May 5, 1985	$1,000 Limit Hold'em	342	Johnny Chan (1/1)	$171,000	Lyle Berman	Results
3	May 6, 1985	$1,000 Seven Card Stud Hi-Lo	149	John Lukas (1/2)	$74,500	Ralph Hoots	Results
4	May 7, 1985	$10,000 Deuce to Seven Draw	19	Tommy Fischer (1/1)	$95,000	Chip Reese (0/2)	Results
5	May 8, 1985	$1,000 No Limit Hold'em	304	Rick Hamil (1/1)	$152,000	Al Emerson	Results
6	May 9, 1985	$1,000 Limit Ace to Five Draw	127	Mark Mitchell (1/1)	$63,500	Paul Fontaine	Results
7	May 10, 1985	$500 Ladies' Seven Card Stud	74	Rose Pifer (1/1)	$18,500	Kathy Hudson	Results
8	May 11, 1985	$5,000 Pot Limit Omaha	22	Amarillo Slim (1/3)	$85,000	Chip Reese (0/2)	Results
9	May 12, 1985	$1,000 Pot Limit Omaha	112	Zorn Smiljanic (1/1)	$105,000	Tom Jacobs	Results
10	May 13, 1985	$1,000 Limit Omaha	111	Tony Thang (1/1)	$55,000	Bill Bennett	Results
11	May 14, 1985	$5,000 Seven Card Stud	49	Harry Thomas (1/1)	$122,500	Artie Cobb (0/1)	Results
12	May 15, 1985	$1,000 Seven Card Stud	171	Don Williams (1/2)	$85,500	Lou Axler	Results
13	May 16, 1985	$1,000 Seven Card Razz	127	Edwin Wyde (1/1)	$83,500	Art Youngblood	Results
14	May 17, 1985	$10,000 No Limit Hold'em Main Event	140	Bill Smith (1/1)	$700,000	T. J. Cloutier	Results
15	May 16, 1985	$1,000 Casino Employees No Limit Hold'em	10	Ted Binion (1/2)	$10,000	Unknown	Results

== Main Event ==
There were 141 entrants to the main event. Each paid $10,000 to enter the tournament, with the top 9 players finishing in the money. Three-time Main Event winner Johnny Moss was the last player out before the final table. The 1985 Main Event final table featured two players, Berry Johnston and Hamid Dastmalchi, who would go on to win the Main Event later on their careers in 1986 and 1992. Smith defeated future Poker Hall of Famer T. J. Cloutier heads-up to win.

=== Final table ===
Place	Name	Prize
1st	Bill Smith	$700,000
2nd	T. J. Cloutier	$280,000
3rd	Berry Johnston	$140,000
4th	Scott Mayfield	$70,000
5th	Hamid Dastmalchi	$70,000
6th	Jesse Alto	$42,000

=== In The Money Finishes ===
Place	Name	Prize
7th	Johnny Moss	$42,000
8th	Mark Rose	$28,000
9th	John Fallon	$28,000
