= Beer card =

Seven of diamonds playing card

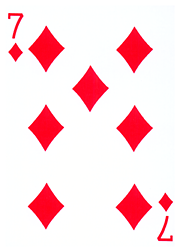
The seven of diamonds

In trick-taking card games such as bridge, the beer card is a name informally given to the seven of diamonds (7♦). Players may agree that if a player wins the last trick of a hand with the 7♦, their partner must buy them a beer. This is not considered as part of the rules of these games, but is an optional and informal side-bet between players. This practice likely originates from Danish Tarok or Skat in the middle of the 20th century. In most decks, the 7♦ is the only diamond number card that lacks rotational symmetry.

== Requirements ==
The requirements vary depending on whether the winner of the last trick is the declarer or a defender. In most cases, though, the last trick must be won by 7♦.

For declarer, the requirements are generally that:

- He must make the contract (exceptions may be made for a successful sacrifice)
- Diamonds must not be trumps (though some people play that only diamond part-scores, and not games or slams, are excluded)
- He must take a justifiable line to win as many tricks as possible

For a defender, the requirements are generally that:

- The contract must be defeated
- Diamonds must not be trumps (though some people play that doubled contracts are excluded)
- She and her partner must try to win as many tricks as possible
- Her partner must try to stop her winning the last trick with 7♦

== Additional rules ==
- The beer card may be won on the first trick; if that does occur, a case of beer is owed to the declarer/defender who won said trick.
- If you go off trying to make the 7♦, you are required to give your partner the amount of IMPs it cost you, in beers.
- If the contract is doubled, two beers are earned. If the contract is redoubled, then four beers are earned.

== Examples ==
♠♤	7
♥	Q 8 3 2
♦	A K Q 10 9
♣♧	Q 7 6
N S
♠♤	Q 8 3 2
♥	A K
♦	J 7 3 2
♣♧	A K 5

South plays in the inferior contract of three notrump (having an excellent six diamonds), against which the opponents cash the first four spade tricks. To maximize the chance of getting a beer, declarer must discard two top diamond honors and a small heart from dummy. If the diamonds do not break 4-0, it is straightforward to cash nine winners, ending with the beer card. If the diamonds don't break, there's a chance that a defender will be pseudosqueezed and choose to discard a diamond. For declarer to discard three diamond honors risks losing the contract unnecessarily, and so forfeits the beer, even if diamonds turn out to break normally.

Alternately, if North-South only exclude diamond partials from beer card enforcement, then the declarer in six diamonds can easily beer assuming trumps break. Declarer wins the (say) heart lead in the South hand and cashes one high trump in the North hand. When they break, declarer cashes two more high trumps, exits a spade, uses the rounded-suit entries to ruff two spades in the North hand, and finally trump the losing heart with the beer card. When they do not break, the simplest line (ruff a heart in the South hand) forces declarer to use the beer card while drawing trumps.

♠♤	A
♥	A 8
♦	A K 9 7 6 5
♣♧	K Q 9 3
N S
♠♤	K 10 8 7 6
♥	9
♦	Q 10 3
♣♧	A J 7 6

West	North	East	South
	1♦	Pass	1♠
2♥	3♥	Pass	4♣
Pass	4NT	Pass	5♣
Pass	7♣	Dbl	Pass
Pass	Pass		

Note that the four notrump bid is the modern Roman Keycard Blackwood with 1430 responses and clubs as trumps. South won the K♥ lead in dummy, drew trumps in three rounds and played a diamond to the ace. When both minors broke, South ruffed the remaining heart in hand and claimed their doubled grand slam along with the beers. Plus 2330, two beers, and 14 IMPs.

In theory, South should have interpreted the final double as a Lightner double and removed to 7♦. However, given that their priorities placed the probable doubled beer ahead of trusting the opponents, they should still not redouble. Since the opponents were non-vulnerable, it just may have occurred to them to remove to seven hearts. While the sacrifice rates to go down two thousand, there is certainly no hope for even North to score the beer.

== See also ==
- List of playing-card nicknames
