= Frank Henderson (poker player) =

American poker player (1931–2015)

- Nickname: Hollywood
- Born: December 14, 1931
- Died: March 6, 2015 (aged 83)

World Series of Poker
- Bracelet: 1
- Money finishes: 36
- Highest WSOP Main Event finish: 2nd, 1987

Frank G. Henderson (December 14, 1931 – March 6, 2015) was an American professional poker player. He resided in Houston, Texas.

Henderson was the runner-up to Johnny Chan in the 1987 World Series of Poker (WSOP) $10,000 no limit hold'em Main Event for $250,000. He also finished in the money of the same event in 1996.

He made final tables in numerous other WSOP events, including Omaha, Draw, Razz and Seven-Card Stud. Henderson won a WSOP bracelet in the 1989 Pot Limit Omaha event, where he defeated a final table that included Jay Heimowitz, Hoyt Corkins, Phil Hellmuth Jr., and T. J. Cloutier.

As of 2010, his total live tournament winnings exceed $1,500,000. His 36 cashes at the WSOP account for $825,076 of those winnings.

Henderson died on March 6, 2015, at the age of 83.
