= Hilbert Shirey =

American poker player

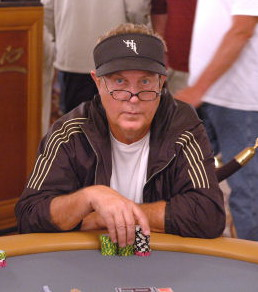
- Shirey at the 2006 World Series of Poker
- Nickname: Hillstreet

World Series of Poker
- Bracelets: 3
- Money finishes: 25
- Highest WSOP Main Event finish: 7th, 1991

World Poker Tour
- Title: None
- Final table: 1
- Money finishes: 4

Hilbert Shirey is an American professional poker player.

Shirey has won three bracelets at the World Series of Poker. He won his first WSOP bracelet in 1987 in a No Limit Hold'em event. His other two bracelets both came in 1995, one in Pot Limit Hold'em and the other Pot Limit Omaha.

In Rick Reilly's book Who's Your Caddy, Shirey is noted as "Hillstreet" in the Dewey Tomko chapter.

He is longtime golf partners with Tomko, and currently resides in Winter Haven, Florida.

As of 2010, his total live tournament winnings exceed $1,480,000. His 25 cashes at the WSOP account for $794,142 of those winnings.

== World Series of Poker Bracelets ==
Year	Tournament	Prize (US$)
1987	$1,500 No Limit Hold'em	$171,600
1995	$2,500 Omaha Pot Limit	$137,000
1995	$2,500 Hold'em Pot Limit	$163,000
