= Rod Peate =

American poker player

World Series of Poker
- Bracelet: 1
- Money finishes: 8
- Highest WSOP Main Event finish: 2nd, 1983

World Poker Tour
- Title: None
- Final table: None
- Money finish: 1

Rod Peate is a poker player from Portland, Oregon.

In the 1983 World Series of Poker, Peate finished runner-up to Tom McEvoy in the Main Event for $216,000. Since then, Peate has cashed in the Main Event four times: 1987, 1990, 1997, and 1998.

In 1995, Peate won a World Series of Poker bracelet in Seven Card Stud Hi/Lo. Peate still participates in tournaments, although a majority of his tournament cashes came in the 1980s and 1990s.

He also cashed in the Legends of Poker tournament at the Bicycle Casino during the fourth season of the World Poker Tour.

As of 2016, his total live tournament winnings exceed $880,000.
