= Jim Doman =

American poker player (1949–1992)

World Series of Poker
- Bracelets: 2
- Money finishes: 11
- Highest WSOP Main Event finish: 8th, 1986

Jim Doman (April 8, 1949 – May 1992) was an American professional poker player who won two World Series of Poker bracelets in the 1980s. He finished eighth in the 1986 WSOP Main Event.

His total lifetime tournament winnings exceeded $800,000.

== WSOP Bracelets ==
Year	Tournament	Prize (US$)
1982	$1,000 No Limit Hold'em	$96,000
1983	$800 Mixed Doubles	$10,100
