= Buster Jackson =

American poker player

World Series of Poker
- Bracelet: 1
- Money finishes: 6
- Highest WSOP Main Event finish: 7th, 1982

George "Buster" Jackson is an American poker player from Elm City, North Carolina, who won a bracelet at the World Series of Poker.

== Career ==
Jackson won his bracelet at the 1983 WSOP in the $1,000 No Limit Hold'em tournament. In 1982, he made the final table of the $10,000 Main Event. Jackson finished in 7th place, earning a $20,800 cash prize in the event which was won by Jack Straus.

== World Series of Poker Bracelets ==
Year	Tournament	Prize (US$)
1983	$1,000 No Limit Hold'em	$124,000
