= The Theory of Poker =

1978 book by David Sklansky

- Author: David Sklansky
- Language: English
- Subject: Poker
- Genre: Non-fiction
- Publication date: 1978

The Theory of Poker is a 1978 book written by David Sklansky. Sklansky has authored or co-authored 13 books on poker.

== History ==
The first version of the book was released in 1978 under a different title, but after various revisions the final version was published in 1987. The book covers various poker concepts such as expected value (EV), semi-bluffing, optimum bluffing frequency, implied odds, and reverse implied odds.

== Content ==
The book explains the rules of poker but does not elaborate extensively on beginner-level strategy. It introduces concepts developed in poker that help players evaluate decisions in different situations. These include ideas such as the Fundamental Theorem of Poker and the concept of theoretical win, including Sklansky Bucks.
