= T. J. Cloutier =

American poker player (born 1939)

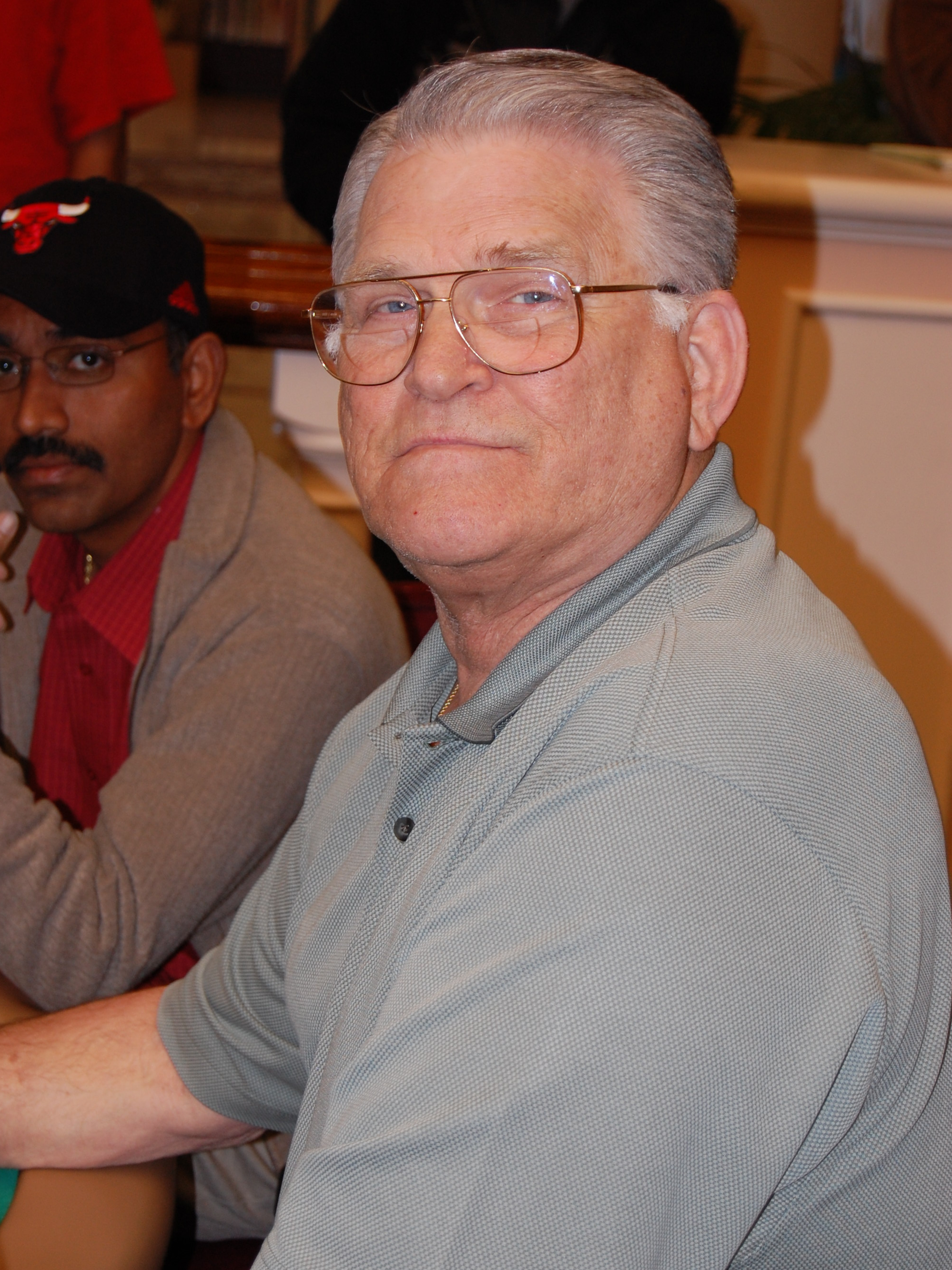
- Cloutier in 2008
- Nickname: T. J.
- Born: Thomas James Cloutier; October 13, 1939 (age 87); Albany, California, U.S.

World Series of Poker
- Bracelets: 6
- Money finishes: 69
- Highest WSOP Main Event finish: 2nd, 1985, 2000

World Poker Tour
- Title: None
- Final tables: 2
- Money finishes: 9

European Poker Tour
- Title: None
- Final table: None
- Money finish: 1
- Football career

Profile
- Position: End

Personal information
- Listed height: 6 ft 3 in (1.91 m)
- Listed weight: 210 lb (95 kg)

Career information
- College: California

Career history
- Montreal Alouettes (1962); Toronto Argonauts (1963)

Thomas James Cloutier (born October 13, 1939) is a professional poker player from Richardson, Texas. He was inducted into the Poker Hall of Fame in 2006. Cloutier was also briefly a professional football player in the Canadian Football League.

== Early life ==
Cloutier was born in Albany, California, and attended the University of California, Berkeley on an athletic scholarship for football and baseball and played in the 1959 Rose Bowl. He later dropped out of college because of family financial hardship.

Cloutier was drafted into the United States Army. After the Army, he played football in the Canadian Football League for the Toronto Argonauts and Montreal Alouettes, but an injury cut his career short.

After his football career ended, Cloutier started a food company, but it was not successful, so following the end of his first marriage, he moved to Texas to work on oil rigs. On his off days, he began to play poker, and quit his job after realizing that he was winning more money playing poker than working. He started playing poker when he was a caddy at a golf course and played poker after the rounds.

In addition to poker, Cloutier is well known for his high-stakes craps sessions.

== Poker career ==
=== World Series of Poker ===
Cloutier specializes in playing tournament poker, especially no-limit and pot limit hold'em. He is the only person in the history of the World Series of Poker (WSOP) to have won events in three types of Omaha played at the World Series — Pot Limit High, Limit High, and Limit 8-or-Better High-low split. Cloutier has won a total of six WSOP bracelets in his career, in addition to many other titles in various kinds of poker games.

He has placed four times in the top five in the Main Event of the World Series of Poker, including two second-place finishes, in 1985, losing to Bill Smith, and 2000, losing to Chris Ferguson. Cloutier also finished in fifth place in 1988, won by Johnny Chan, and in third place in 1998, won by Scotty Nguyen.

In 2009, Cloutier was one of numerous players turned away from the Main Event, as registration was capped on that particular day. He did admit it was own fault for not signing up earlier and not looking for special treatment.

=== WSOP bracelets ===
Year	Tournament	Prize
1987	$1,000 Limit Omaha Hi	$72,000
1994	$1,500 Limit Omaha 8 or Better	$135,000
1994	$2,500 Pot Limit Hold'em	$163,000
1998	$2,500 Pot Limit Omaha Hi	$136,000
2004	$1,500 Seven Card Razz	$90,500
2005	$5,000 No Limit Hold'em	$657,100

In January 2010, The Plano Pawn Shop auctioned off Cloutier's 2005 bracelet on eBay for $4,006.

=== World Poker Tour ===
Cloutier also plays in World Poker Tour (WPT) events, where his highest finish is third in the 2003 Legends of Poker event, won by fellow professional Mel Judah. He has also been featured in the Ultimate Poker Challenge, the National Heads-Up Poker Championship, Poker Superstars Invitational Tournament and Poker Royale: Battle of the Ages.

As of 2024, his total live tournament winnings exceed $10,500,000.

== Poker writings ==
Cloutier is the co-author (with Tom McEvoy) of four books on poker:

- Championship Tournament Practice Hands
- Championship Holdem
- Championship Omaha
- Championship No-Limit and Pot Limit Hold'em.

He has also written How To Win The Championship: Hold'em Strategies For The Final Table, a book covering tournament strategy with an emphasis on the final few tables.

Cloutier formerly wrote for Card Player magazine.

== Media ==
- He features in the computer game World Class Poker with T.J. Cloutier.
- He appears in the "Prince of Poker" episode of the History Channel series Breaking Vegas.
