= Ken Flaton =

American poker player (1940–2004)

- Nickname: Skyhawk
- Born: June 28, 1940; New York City, New York, U.S.
- Died: November 7, 2004 (aged 64); Henderson, Nevada, U.S.

World Series of Poker
- Bracelet: 1
- Money finishes: 39
- Highest WSOP Main Event finish: 18th, 1997

World Poker Tour
- Title: None
- Final table: None
- Money finishes: 2

Ken Flaton (June 28, 1940 – November 7, 2004) was an American professional poker player. He was born in New York City, New York, and settled in Henderson, Nevada, after serving in the US Army.

Flaton won a World Series of Poker (WSOP) bracelet in 1983 in the $1,000 seven-card stud event. He also finished in the money of the $10,000 no limit hold'em main event in 1986 (28th), 1988 (23rd), 1990 (31st), and 1997 (18th).

Flaton won the first United States Poker Championship in 1996 and competed in the World Poker Tour (WPT).

Flaton died in November 2004 at St. Rose Dominican Hospital – Siena Campus, aged 64. He died of a heart attack, although he was suffering from lung cancer at the time, despite being a non-smoker.

His total live tournament winnings were at least $2,575,000. His 39 cashes at the WSOP accounted for $568,525 of his lifetime winnings.

== Nickname ==
Flaton got his nickname, "Skyhawk", when fellow professional Stu Ungar, after seeing Flaton spread his arms and then rake in the pot while in a poker tournament, commented that Flaton "swooped down on piles of chips like a 'skyhawk.'"
