= Artie Cobb =

American poker player (born 1942)

- Nickname: None
- Born: November 17, 1942 (age 84)

World Series of Poker
- Bracelets: 4
- Money finishes: 29
- Highest WSOP Main Event finish: 28th, 1990

Artie Cobb (born November 17, 1942) is an American professional poker player, based in Las Vegas, Nevada. Cobb began playing poker in New York, where he is originally from, and would later move to Las Vegas in 1976.

== Poker career ==
Cobb has won four bracelets at the World Series of Poker (WSOP), three of them in seven-card stud.

He won his first bracelet in the 1983 WSOP $1,000 seven card stud event Hi-Lo event, defeating David Singer during the heads-up play. This was Cobb's first cash in any WSOP event.

Cobb won his second bracelet in 1987, defeating multi-bracelet winner Don Williams heads-up in a seven card stud event. He later won two more bracelets at the WSOP, both in seven card stud events in 1991 and 1998.

Cobb cashed in the $10,000 no limit Texas hold'em Main Event in 1986 (34th), 1987 (34th), and 1990 (28th).

As of 2011, his total live tournament winnings exceed $1,550,000.

== World Series of Poker Bracelets ==
| Year | Tournament | Prize (US$) |
|---|---|---|
| 1983 | $1,000 Seven Card Stud Hi-Lo | $52,000 |
| 1987 | $5,000 Seven Card Stud | $142,000 |
| 1991 | $1,500 Seven Card Stud | $146,400 |
| 1998 | $2,500 Seven Card Stud | $152,000 |
