= Pifer Mountain =

Mountain in West Virginia, United States

Coordinates: 39.1812°N 79.7680°W

Pifer Mountain is a summit in West Virginia, in the United States. With an elevation of 2,740 feet (840 m), Pifer Mountain is the 472nd highest summit in the state of West Virginia.

Pifer Mountain has the name of Andrew Pifer.
