= Howard Andrew =

American poker player (1934–2021)

- Nickname: Tahoe
- Born: 1934
- Died: January 13, 2021 (aged 86)

World Series of Poker
- Bracelets: 2
- Money finishes: 23
- Highest WSOP Main Event finish: 8th, 1984

Howard Andrew (1934 – January 13, 2021) was an American poker player, best known for his success at the 1976 World Series of Poker (WSOP). He participated in the WSOP Main Event each year from 1974 until his death, the longest such streak of any player.

Andrew won "both The Horseshoe's Businessmen's and Preliminary Hold-Em tournaments in 1976", earning him two bracelets in consecutive days. The 1978 WSOP Media Guide called him "one of the World Series of Poker's most formidable non-pros ... an industrial engineer ... [with] a daredevil reputation. If an award were given out to the player who shoved all his chips to the center of the pot most often, he'd probably win it."

Andrew finished in the money in other events at the WSOP, including an 8th-place finish at the 1984 World Series of Poker main event, which earned him $26,400, the same share won by 7th-place finisher Mike Allen and 9th-place finisher Rusty La Page.

Andrew died on January 13, 2021. At the time of his death, his live tournament winnings exceeded $1,500,000.

== World Series of Poker bracelets ==
Year	Tournament	Prize (US$)
1976	$2,500 No Limit Hold'em	$28,000
1976	$1,000 No Limit Hold'em	$23,600
