= John Holmes Jenkins =

American historian, antiquarian bookseller, publisher, author, and poker player

- Born: March 22, 1940; Beaumont, Texas
- Died: April 16, 1989 (aged 49)
- Occupations: bookseller, publisher
- Known for: Jenkins Publishing Company (founder)
- Awards: Summerfield G. Roberts Award (1973)

John Holmes Jenkins III (1940 – April 16, 1989) was an American historian, antiquarian bookseller, publisher, author, and poker player.

== Career ==
Jenkins published his first book Recollections of Early Texas History the year he graduated from high school. He went on to become a well-known dealer in antiquarian books and documents, primarily of Texas history. Unlike many booksellers, he read much of what he bought and sold, resulting in his ten-volume Papers of the Texas Revolution. His Jenkins Publishing Company, including the Pemberton Press for trade publishing and the San Felipe Press for private publishing, produced more than 300 titles.

Jenkins was elected a fellow of the Texas State Historical Association in 1967.

In 1971, Jenkins was instrumental in helping the FBI recover an extremely valuable portfolio of original colored engravings, John James Audubon's Birds of America, stolen from Union College in Schenectady, New York. Jenkins's accounts of this experience, the purchase of the Eberstadt collection, and other lively reminiscences appear in his book Audubon and Other Capers, published in 1976. That same year, he received an honorary doctor of letters degree from Union College for his role in recovering the Audubon portfolio, as well as for his contributions to historical scholarship and the book trade. In 1980, Jenkins was elected president of the Antiquarian Booksellers' Association of America. In this capacity, he worked as principal organizer of a national system for identifying and publicizing the theft or loss of rare books and other valuable materials from libraries, booksellers, and private collections, and for seeing that the thieves are arrested and prosecuted.

Jenkins became a champion poker player in Las Vegas, Nevada, where he was known as "Austin Squatty" because of his habit of sitting cross-legged. He finished in 7th place at the 1983 World Series of Poker main event, earning $21,600, and two months before his death he won first place in Las Vegas at Amarillo Slim's No Limit Hold-em, earning $99,050.

== Death ==
Jenkins was killed on April 16, 1989, by a shot to the back of his head, near Bastrop, Texas, while doing field research as part of his work on a biography of Edward Burleson, which was published posthumously, coauthored and completed by Kenneth Kesselus, a Texas historian and first cousin of Jenkins. Although shot in the back of the head, the sheriff declared it a suicide, claiming he somehow disposed of the gun which was never found.

== See also ==
- List of unsolved murders (1980–1999)

== Sources ==
- Austin American-Statesman, April 23, 1989.
- Gregory Curtis, "Forgery Texas Style," Texas Monthly, March 1989.
- Dallas Morning News, April 18, 19, 28, 1989.
- John H. Jenkins Papers, Barker Texas History Center, University of Texas at Austin.
- Otho Plummer, "John H. Jenkins: Bookseller," Texana 3 (Fall 1965).
