= Rose Pifer =

American poker player

World Series of Poker
- Bracelet: 1
- Money finishes: 2
- Highest WSOP Main Event finish: None

Rose Pifer was a World Series of Poker champion in the 1985 $500 Ladies - Limit 7 Card Stud event.

Her total live tournament winnings are $19,250.

== World Series of Poker bracelets ==
Year	Tournament	Prize (US$)
1985	$500 Ladies - Limit 7 Card Stud	$18,500
