= 1983 World Series of Poker =

Series of poker tournaments

- Location: Binion's Horseshoe, Las Vegas, Nevada
- Dates: May 3 – 21

Champion
- (United States) Tom McEvoy

The 1983 World Series of Poker (WSOP) was a series of poker tournaments held from May 9 to 12, 1983, at Binion's Horseshoe.

== Events ==
There were 13 preliminary events at the 1983 WSOP. After the Main Event, there were two other tournaments on the schedule. This was the first World Series of Poker where the Main Event was not the final tournament.

#	Date	Event	Entries	Winner	Prize	Runner-up	Results
1	May 3, 1983	$2,500 Ace to Five Draw	37	David Angel (1/1)	$46,250	Mike Cox	Results
2	May 4, 1983	$1,500 No Limit Hold'em	194	David Baxter (1/1)	$145,500	Richard Klamian	Results
3	May 5, 1983	$1,000 Seven Card Stud Split	104	Artie Cobb (1/1)	$52,000	David Singer	Results
4	May 6, 1983	$800 Mixed Doubles	50	Jim Doman (1/2) & Donna Doman (1/1)	$10,000	Cheryl Davis and A.J. Myers (0/2)	Results
5	May 7, 1983	$1,000 Seven Card Stud	124	Ken Flaton (1/1)	$62,000	Stu Ungar (0/3)	Results
6	May 8, 1983	$500 Ladies' Seven Card Stud	64	Carolyn Gardner (1/1)	$16,000	Kim Bye	Results
7	May 9, 1983	$1,000 No Limit Hold'em	248	Buster Jackson (1/1)	$124,000	Rick Hamil	Results
8	May 10, 1983	$2,500 Match Play	32	Berry Johnston (1/2)	$40,000	Ray Zee	Results
9	May 11, 1983	$1,000 Seven Card Razz	86	John Lukas (1/1)	$43,000	Buddy McIntosh	Results
10	May 12, 1983	$1,000 Limit Hold'em	234	Tom McEvoy (1/1)	$117,000	Donnacha O'Dea	Results
11	May 13, 1983	$1,000 Limit Omaha	51	David Sklansky (1/3)	$25,500	Perry Green (0/3)	Results
12	May 14, 1983	$1,000 Ace to Five Draw	99	Don Todd (1/1)	$49,500	Richard Stone	Results
13	May 15, 1983	$5,000 Seven Card Stud	44	Stu Ungar (1/4)	$110,000	Dewey Tomko (0/1)	Results
14	May 16, 1983	$10,000 No Limit Hold'em Main Event	108	Tom McEvoy (2/2)	$540,000	Rod Peate	Results
15	May 21, 1983	$1,000 Casino Employees No-Limit Hold'em	10	Ted Binion (1/1)	$10,000	Unknown	Results
16	May 21, 1983	$10,000 No-Limit 2-7 Draw Lowball	21	Dick Carson (1/1)	$105,000	Jack Straus (0/2)	Results

== Main Event ==
There were 108 entrants to the main event. Each paid $10,000 to enter the tournament, with the top 9 players finishing in the money. Doyle Brunson fell just short in his attempt to win the main event for what would have been a record-tying third time when he finished third. Rod Peate and Tom McEvoy went on to play the longest heads-up match in World Series history until 2006. The match lasted over seven hours. McEvoy emerged victorious becoming the first player to win the main event via a satellite tournament. Donnacha O'Dea was the first foreign player ever to place in the money at the WSOP.

=== Final table ===
Place	Name	Prize
1st	Tom McEvoy	$540,000
2nd	Rod Peate	$216,000
3rd	Doyle Brunson	$108,000
4th	Carl McKelvey	$54,000
5th	Robert Geers	$54,000
6th	Donnacha O'Dea	$43,200
7th	John Holmes Jenkins	$21,600
8th	R.R. Pennington	$21,600
9th	George Huber	$21,600
