= Berry Johnston =

American poker player (born 1935)

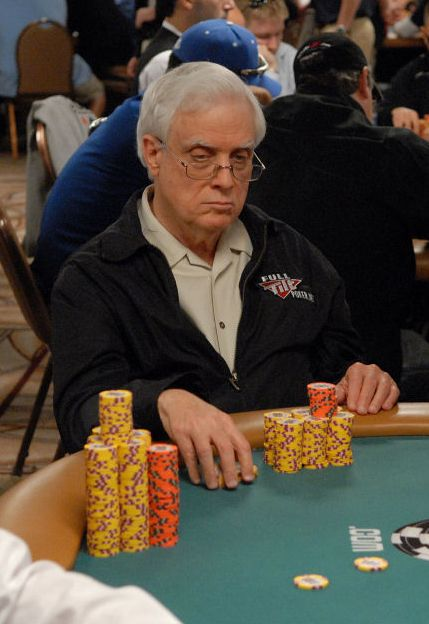
- Johnston at the 2007 World Series of Poker
- Nickname: Numbers
- Born: Berry Enfield Johnston; September 25, 1935 (age 91); Oklahoma, U.S.

World Series of Poker
- Bracelets: 5
- Money finishes: 66
- Highest WSOP Main Event finish: Winner, 1986

Berry Enfield Johnston (born September 25, 1935) is an American professional poker player. He is best known as the 1986 World Champion, but he has also won four other bracelets at the World Series of Poker (WSOP) in addition to cashes and wins in many other tournaments throughout his career.

== Poker career ==
Johnston won the 1986 World Series of Poker Main Event, and placed third in 1983 and 1985 and fifth in the 1990 WSOP Main Events, respectively. He has made at least 29 final tables at the WSOP and has finished in the money on at least 66 occasions. He has also cashed ten times in the WSOP Main Event, more than any other player. His most recent cash in the Main Event came in 2007, when he finished in 113th place in a field of over six thousand players, for which Johnston won $58,570. Having cashed in at least one event every year from 1982–2010, Johnston holds the record at the WSOP for longest cashing streak at 29 years.

Johnston cashed three times in the 2008 World Series of Poker, including tenth place in an Omaha Hi/Lo event.

Johnston has also played on the NBC Poker After Dark Series, most recently in 2008 among some of his fellow World Series of Poker Main Event Champions. Berry finished fourth in the tournament, which was won by Johnny Chan. The other world champions in the tournament were Phil Hellmuth, Huck Seed, Chris Ferguson, and Jamie Gold.

He was inducted into the Seniors Poker Hall of Fame in the early 1990s and Poker Hall of Fame in 2004. Johnston was the only inductee in the 2004 class.

As of 2010, his total live tournament winnings exceed $3,450,000. His 60 cashes as the WSOP account for $2,075,527 of those winnings.

=== World Series of Poker bracelets ===
Year	Tournament	Prize
1983	$2,500 Match Play	$40,000
1986	$10,000 No Limit Hold'em World Championship	$570,000
1990	$2,500 Limit Hold'em	$254,000
1995	$1,500 Limit Omaha	$91,200
2001	$1,500 Razz	$83,810
