= Roger Moore (poker player) =

American poker player (1938–2011)

- Born: April 10, 1938
- Died: October 22, 2011 (aged 73); Eastman, Georgia, U.S.

World Series of Poker
- Bracelet: 1
- Money finishes: 12
- Highest WSOP Main Event finish: 6th, 1986

Roger Moore (April 10, 1938 – October 22, 2011) was a professional poker player.

Moore grew up the son of sharecroppers. He quit school in the eighth grade and soon afterwards entered into military service. After the military he worked as a civil servant and for fun he would play poker. When he realized he was making more money playing poker, he quit his job and in 1968 moved to Las Vegas, Nevada.

Moore played at the World Series of Poker regularly, beginning in 1974, and won his bracelet in the $5,000 Seven-Card Stud event in 1994. He earned a prize of $144,000, in addition to the bracelet, for this win.

His career tournament earnings totaled over $600,000. He was inducted into the Poker Hall of Fame in 1997.

He died in 2011.
