= Card Player =

Bimonthly magazine

- Editor-in-Chief: Julio Rodriguez
- Categories: Poker
- Frequency: Biweekly
- Founder: June Field
- First issue: October 1988
- Company: Card Player Media
- Country: United States
- Based in: Las Vegas
- Language: English
- Website: www.cardplayer.com
- ISSN: 1089-2044

Card Player, also known as The Gambling Authority, is an industry-leading publication and web portal specializing in poker media, poker strategy and poker tournament coverage. The media company is headquartered in Las Vegas, Nevada.

== History and Profile ==
Card Player Magazine was founded in 1988 by WSOP bracelet winner June Field. “I wanted a media vehicle that would be a reliable source for advertisers and readers alike…one they could turn to and find out what’s happening, where it’s happening, and who is making it happen," said Field. "Our slogan was, 'the magazine for those who play to win.'”

In 1993, the company was sold to Poker Hall of Famer and "First Lady of Poker" Linda Johnson. "When I first took over the magazine, poker was legal only in Oregon, Washington, Nevada, Montana, and California. I was very fortunate that poker began to expand all over the country," recalled Johnson. "My two business partners, Denny Axel and Scott Rogers, and I decided that we should turn the magazine... into a glossy, color publication. Everything kicked off from there."

In 1998, it was acquired by Seattle businessman turned two-time bracelet winner Barry Shulman, who directed the expansion of CardPlayer.com, which to that point only existed to sell magazine subscriptions. "I came down to Vegas in the early '90s to retire... but I wasn't meant to be retired," Shulman said. "It wasn't for sale. I just muscled my way in there. It was clear to me that poker was going to boom. Crystal clear."

With the introduction of online poker, the invention of the hole-card camera for televised poker broadcasts, and the effect of the Moneymaker Boom, Card Player established itself as the industry's largest informational resource. The site is known for its news (poker and gambling) and features, strategy guides, comprehensive player database, tournament schedules and results, poker odds calculator, and poker school.

Card Player Media was sold in 2024. Julio Rodriguez serves as Publisher and Editor-in-Chief.

Card Player Magazine publishes 26 issues annually, with a new issue every two weeks. An issue typically consists of feature articles, tournament reports, and columns. Feature articles are usually in-depth profiles of prominent players on the tournament circuit. Tournament reports are made up of the richest and most prestigious poker events. Each issue also has a selection of strategy columns coming from a stable of acclaimed poker players and authors which includes former world champions.

The magazine has a monthly circulation of approximately 300,000. It is available in print for subscribers, or for free in the majority of cardrooms in the United States. Each issue is also published online, and past issues can be viewed in the magazine's archive. Other variations of the magazine over the years have included Card Player Europe, and a short-lived Card Player College edition.

In 2008, Card Player Media launched SpadeClub.com, an online poker website. Members of SpadeClub paid a monthly subscription fee to enter into a variety of free poker tournaments. SpadeClub ceased operations and migrated all users into Zen Gaming in September 2010.

Card Player Media has content licensing agreements with media partners Card Player Bulgaria (magazine and website), Card Player Polska (Poland), Card Player Italia (Italy), Pokerilehti (Finland & Estonia), Poker (Card Player France), Card Player Deutsch (Germany), Poker Magazine (Sweden), Card Player.fi (Finland website), Card Player South Africa (South Africa), Card Player Espana (Spain), Card Player Brasil (Brazil) and Card Player Latin America, which publishes Card Player Argentina+Uruguay.

According to Recleudo.com, Cardplayer.com has been acquired by Clickout Media in January 2025.

== Player of the Year Award ==
Card Player is also well known for its prestigious Player of the Year award. Started in 1997, it goes to the player who has the most outstanding tournament results throughout the year. Players are awarded points for final-table finishes in major events. Points are adjusted based on the size of the buy-in, as well as the number of entrants.

Men Nguyen (1997, 2001, 2003, 2005) has the most POY titles, having finished atop the leaderboard in four out of the first nine years of the award's existence. Four players have won twice, including David Pham (2000, 2007), Poker Hall of Famer Daniel Negreanu (2004, 2013), Stephen Chidwick (2019, 2022), and Adrian Mateos (2017, 2024).
