= Don Williams (poker player) =

American poker player (1942–2013)

- Born: May 2, 1942
- Died: April 10, 2013 (aged 70)

World Series of Poker
- Bracelets: 3
- Money finishes: 21
- Highest WSOP Main Event finish: 4th, 1991

Don Williams (May 2, 1942 – April 10, 2013) was an American poker player.

== Biography ==
Williams has won three bracelets at the World Series of Poker (WSOP), and has cashed in many other WSOP events including the Main Event.

He won his first bracelet in 1982 in the $1,000 Seven Card Stud event. In 1985, he won his second bracelet in the same event. Williams won his third bracelet in a Razz event in 1988. He has made final tables in various events at the WSOP and has also finished runner-up in World Series events five times.

Williams has also cashed in the WSOP Main Event several times. His highest finish in the Main Event occurred in 1991 when he made the final table and ended up with a fourth place showing. He won a prize of $115,000 for this final table finish.

As of 2010, his total live tournament winnings exceeded $1,700,000. His 21 cashes at the WSOP account for $799,828 of those winnings.

Williams died on April 10, 2013, at the age of 70.

== World Series of Poker bracelets ==
Year	Tournament	Prize (US$)
1982	$1,000 Seven-Card Stud	$56,000
1985	$1,000 Seven-Card Stud	$85,500
1988	$1,000 Razz	$76,800
