= Jack Straus =

American poker player (1930–1988)

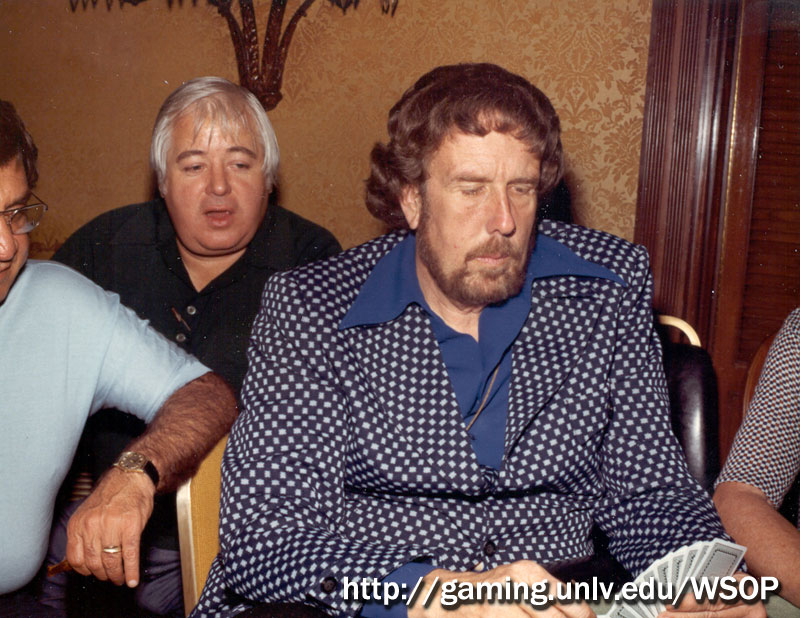
- Jack "Treetop" Straus
- Nickname: Treetop
- Born: June 16, 1930
- Died: August 17, 1988 (age 58); Los Angeles, California, U.S.

World Series of Poker
- Bracelets: 2
- Money finishes: 4
- Highest WSOP Main Event finish: Winner, 1982

Jack "Treetop" Straus (June 16, 1930 – August 17, 1988) was an American professional poker player.

He is best known for winning the 1982 World Series of Poker Main Event, where he was able to come back from being down to one chip earlier in the tournament, giving meaning to the poker phrase "a chip and a chair". In addition, Straus is known for successfully pulling off one of the best bluffs in the history of poker.

== Poker career ==
Straus began playing in World Series of Poker events in the early 1970s. He finished in fourth place in the 1972 Main Event. He won his first bracelet in 1973 in the $3,000 Deuce to Seven Draw event for $16,500. Straus finished in third place in the Main Event that year. He won the 1982 World Series of Poker Main Event, earning $520,000 and a second WSOP bracelet. Straus' appearances at the final table of the Main Event in 1972, 1973, and 1982 put him in an elite group of players to have made the final table three or more times. Other players to have accomplished this include Main Event champions such as Johnny Moss, Doyle Brunson, Stu Ungar, Johnny Chan and Dan Harrington.

== 1982 WSOP Main Event, "A Chip and a Chair" ==
Famously, Straus's 1982 win was a comeback after being down to a single $500 chip, supposedly the origin of the common tournament poker aphorism: "a chip and a chair." Although accounts vary, the most common story is that he pushed his chips into the pot, was called and lost the hand. Straus had thought he was eliminated from the tournament, but when he got up, he discovered he had one chip left under a napkin on the table.

Because he did not declare himself all-in, the tournament directors allowed him to continue playing. Modern lore says that this feat occurred at the final table, but the 2005 book All In, which documents the history of the WSOP, confirms that it occurred early in the second day, and did leave him with a $500 chip before his comeback.

== The bluff ==
Straus is credited with one of the most celebrated bluffs of all time. While playing in a high-stakes no limit Texas Hold'em cash game, Straus had won several large pots in a row and so decided that he would raise the next hand pre-flop with any two cards. When he looked down he found that he had been dealt 7–2 offsuit, the worst starting hand in Texas Hold'em, but, playing a 'rush', he raised anyway. Straus's raise was called by a single opponent and the flop came 7–3–3. This was a good flop for a 7–2, so Straus bet out. However his tight opponent made a large raise, indicating a likely overpair to the board.

Straus knew he was almost certainly behind, but he decided that he might be able to beat his opponent by representing trip threes, so he called the large raise. The turn was a 2, for a board of 7–3–3–2, which was no help to Straus with a better pair already on the board, but he made a huge bet anyway. This set his opponent thinking deeply. Straus knew that he was desperate to avoid a call, as his chances of drawing out to win on the river were very slim. After a few minutes, Straus offered his opponent a proposition. He told him that for $25, he could choose either one of Straus's hole cards and Straus would show it to him. The opponent considered for a while, then tossed Straus $25 and chose a card. Straus showed him the deuce.

After another long pause, his opponent eventually figured that Straus would only make such an offer if both of his hole-cards were deuces, therefore giving him a full house: deuces over threes. He reluctantly folded, and Jack Straus entered poker folklore as one of the most creative bluffers of all time. The bluff was depicted in the Stu Ungar biopic Stuey; however, Straus is not a character in the film and the bluff is credited to another player.

== Outside poker ==
Straus was nicknamed "Treetop" because he was 6'6"; he attended Texas A&M. While it has been reported that he had played varsity basketball there, his name does not appear on the school's all-time list of basketball letter earners. Aside from his poker-playing, Straus was well known as a marksman, a big-game hunter, and for his erudite wit.

== Death ==
After his championship win, Straus continued to actively play poker until his death.

He died of an aortic aneurysm on August 17, 1988, at the age of 58 while playing in a high-stakes poker game at the Bicycle Casino in Los Angeles. He was posthumously inducted into the Poker Hall of Fame later that year.

Straus's live poker tournament winnings exceeded $750,000.

== World Series of Poker bracelets ==
Year	Tournament	Prize (US$)
1973	$3,000 Deuce to Seven Draw	$16,500
1982	$10,000 Championship Event - No Limit Hold'em	$520,000
