= Johnny Chan =

American poker player (born 1957)

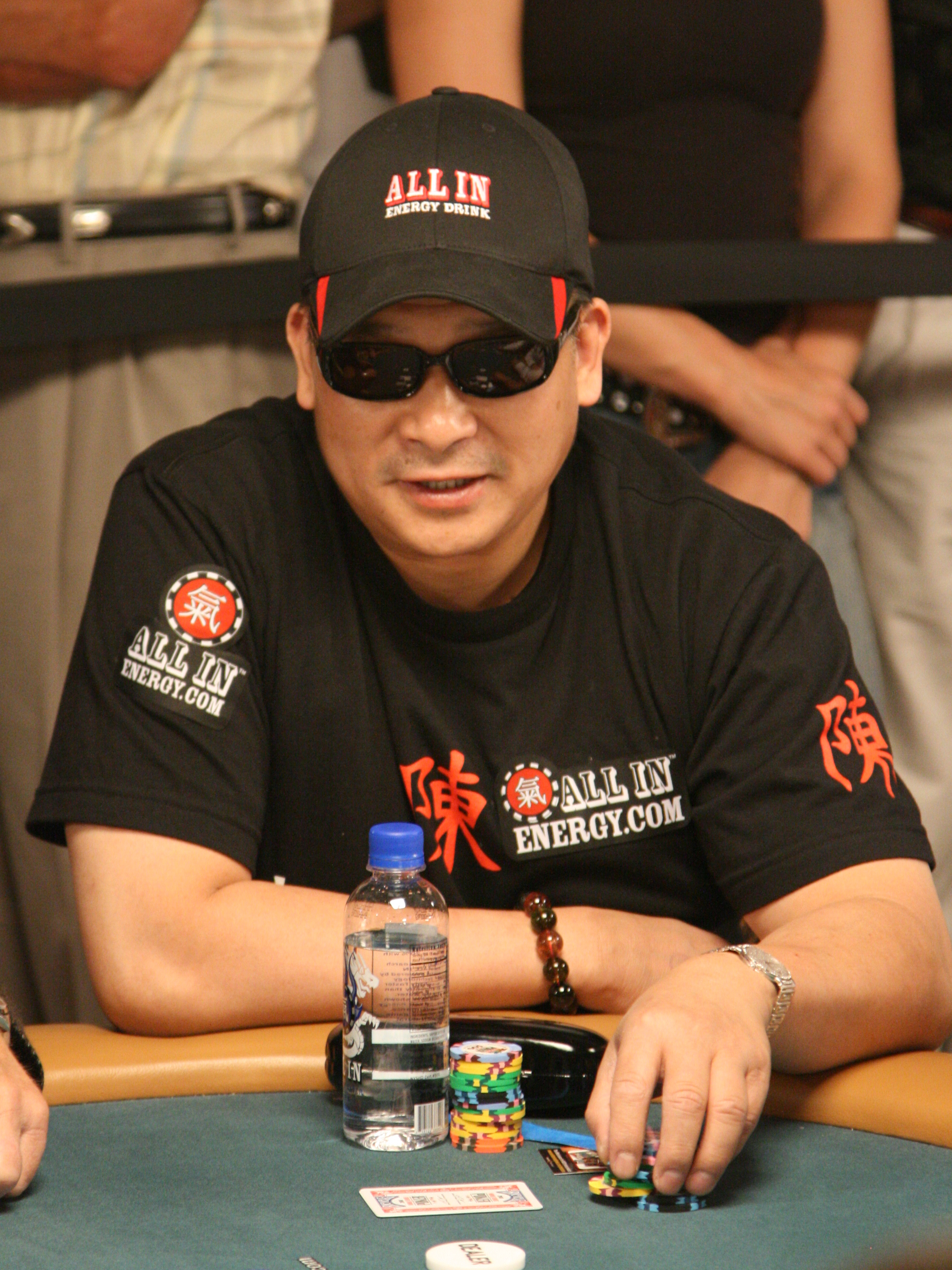
- Chan at the 2008 World Series of Poker
- Nickname: Orient Express
- Born: 1957 (age 68–69); Guangzhou, China

World Series of Poker
- Bracelets: 10
- Final tables: 27
- Money finishes: 45
- Highest WSOP Main Event finish: Winner, 1987, 1988

World Poker Tour
- Title: None
- Final table: None
- Money finishes: 6

Johnny Chan
- Traditional Chinese: 陳金海
- Simplified Chinese: 陈金海
Transcriptions
Standard Mandarin
- Hanyu Pinyin: Chén Jīnhǎi
Yue: Cantonese
- Jyutping: Can4 Gam1hoi2

Alternative Chinese name
- Traditional Chinese: 陳強尼
- Simplified Chinese: 陈强尼
Transcriptions
Standard Mandarin
- Hanyu Pinyin: Chén Qiángní

Johnny Chan (Chinese: 陳金海; (Note: He has another Chinese name "Chen Qiangni" (traditional Chinese: 陳強尼; simplified Chinese: 陈强尼; pinyin: Chén Qiángní) which is also commonly used by Chinese-language media. It is a transliteration of "Johnny Chan" (as "Chen" for "Chan", "Qiangni" for "Johnny") rather than his Chinese birth name.) (born 1957) is an American professional poker player. He has won 10 World Series of Poker bracelets, including the 1987 and 1988 World Series of Poker main events consecutively.

== Early life ==
Chan moved with his family in 1962 from Guangzhou to Hong Kong, then in 1968 to Phoenix, Arizona, and later in 1973 to Houston, Texas, where his family owned restaurants. He started playing cards with the staff of the restaurant.

When he was 21, Chan dropped out of the University of Houston, where he was majoring in hotel and restaurant management, and moved to Las Vegas to become a professional gambler.

However, his first live casino experience was before his 21st birthday. During a visit in Las Vegas at the age of 16, Chan managed to buy in for a cash game, allegedly turning $500 into $20,000 in one night, before losing the whole $20,000 the next day.

== Poker tournaments ==
=== World Series of Poker ===
Chan won his first WSOP bracelet in 1985 in a Limit Hold'em event. Chan won the World Series of Poker (WSOP) in 1987 and 1988 becoming the first foreign national to win the main event. A videotape of the 1988 WSOP final heads-up match is featured in the 1998 movie Rounders, in which Chan makes a cameo appearance. He almost won a third consecutive title, but finished as the runner-up in 1989 to Phil Hellmuth. He is the last player to win back-to-back WSOP Main Events.

Chan added bracelets with victories at the WSOP in 1994, 1997, 2000, and 2002.

In 2003, Chan won his eighth and ninth bracelets in Pot Limit Omaha and No Limit Hold'em events, both with a $5,000 buy-in.

In 2005, Chan became the first player to win ten World Series of Poker bracelets, defeating Phil Laak in a $2,500 Pot Limit Texas hold 'em event. At the time, he broke a tie with Johnny Moss, Doyle Brunson, and Phil Hellmuth. Brunson later tied him as the same WSOP. He is currently tied with Doyle Brunson and Erik Seidel for third place with 10 World Series of Poker bracelets, behind Phil Ivey (11) and Phil Hellmuth (17). He was inducted into the Poker Hall of Fame in 2002.

In 2008, Chan cashed for the first time in the Main Event since 1992, earning $32,166 for his 329th-place finish.

In 2010, Chan cashed in the Main Event taking 156th place for $57,102.

==== World Series of Poker Bracelets ====
Year	Tournament	Prize (US$)
1985	$1,000 Limit Hold'em	$171,000
1987	$10,000 No Limit Hold'em World Championship	$625,000
1988	$10,000 No Limit Hold'em World Championship	$700,000
1994	$1,500 Seven Card Stud	$135,600
1997	$5,000 Deuce to Seven Draw	$164,250
2000	$1,500 Pot Limit Omaha	$178,800
2002	$2,500 No Limit Hold'em Gold Bracelet Match Play	$34,000
2003	$5,000 No Limit Hold'em	$224,400
2003	$5,000 Pot Limit Omaha	$158,100
2005	$2,500 Pot Limit Hold'em	$303,025

=== Poker Superstars ===
Chan competed in the $400,000 Poker Superstars Invitational Tournament in February 2005. He came back from having $20,000 chips out of $3,200,000 in play to finish in second place to Gus Hansen. Chan later competed in Poker Superstars II during the summer of 2005. He defeated 22 players to make it to the finals. He defeated Todd Brunson in the finals after three matches to win the $400,000 first prize. Chan appeared in Poker Superstars III where he made it as far as the semi-finals but was defeated by Todd Brunson after three matches.

=== Poker After Dark ===
On NBC's late-night show Poker After Dark, a six-person $20,000 buy-in winner-takes-all tournament, Johnny Chan has the most victories to date with four wins in six appearances. He came in second and fifth when he did not win.

His appearances in which he made it to heads-up were:

- WSOP Champions — originally aired January 15–20, 2007 — Won heads-up against Chris Moneymaker
- Champions Week — originally aired June 11–16, 2007 — Lost heads-up against Joe Hachem
- World Champions — originally aired February 11–16, 2008 — Won heads-up against Phil Hellmuth
- International — originally aired February 25 – March 1, 2008 — Won heads-up against Patrik Antonius
- Dream Table III — originally aired March 23–27, 2009 — Won heads-up against Jennifer Tilly

=== Other tournaments ===
Chan won Bob Stupak's 1981 American Cup poker tournament. He defeated all 9 other players at the final table in less than an hour. As a result, Stupak gave Chan the nickname "the Orient Express".

Chan won the $10,000 No Limit Hold'em tournament at the America's Cup of Poker in consecutive years in 1982 and 1983.

Chan played in the 2004 and 2005 World Series of Poker Tournament of Champions events and the National Heads-Up Poker Championship in the same years.

As of 2025, his total live tournament winnings exceed $8,700,000.

== Personal life ==
In addition to playing poker, Chan owns a fast-food franchise in the Las Vegas Stratosphere Hotel and is a consultant for casinos and game makers. Chan has written for Card Player magazine. He appeared in the first (2006) and 2011 seasons of the GSN series High Stakes Poker.

In 2005, Chan collaborated with Mark Karowe to release Play Poker Like Johnny Chan (ISBN 1-933074-48-5), an instructional book on several different types of poker. On November 28, 2006, the follow-up titled: Million Dollar Hold'em: Winning Big in Limit Cash Games (ISBN 1-58042-200-4), which focuses on limit hold'em strategy, was released.

In 2007, Chan launched an online poker room, ChanPokerOnline.com. It closed in August 2008.

Chan is a former smoker who also does not drink alcohol.

Chan wrote a regular article in the bi-monthly magazine Trader Monthly.

=== In popular culture ===
Johnny Chan portrayed himself in the 1998 film Rounders. In a flashback scene, Chan is bluffed out of a pot by the main character Mike McDermott (Matt Damon).

He also appeared in the 2009 Hong Kong movie Poker King as himself.
