= List of players on High Stakes Poker =

High Stakes Poker is a cash game poker television program broadcast originally by the cable television Game Show Network (GSN) in the United States and now broadcast on PokerGO. It premiered on January 16, 2006 and ended on December 17, 2007 for the first 4 seasons. Seasons 5 through 7 ran from March 1, 2009 to May 21, 2011. Season 8 debuted on December 16, 2020 and ended on March 17, 2021. The poker variant played on the show is no limit Texas hold 'em. The show was taped in a poker room setting at various casino hotel locations in Las Vegas, Nevada. The latest season is taped in the PokerGO studio inside Aria Resort and Casino.

The participants on the show include both professional poker players and amateur players, including celebrity amateurs who have had some success in major tournaments, such as Jerry Buss, Sam Simon, Nick Cassavetes, and others.

== Players ==
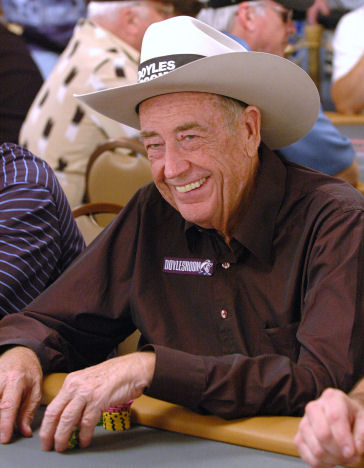
Doyle Brunson, 77, is the oldest participant on High Stakes Poker

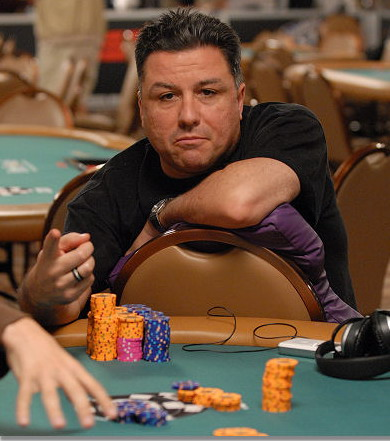
Eli Elezra won a $47,000 pot in Season 3 with four aces

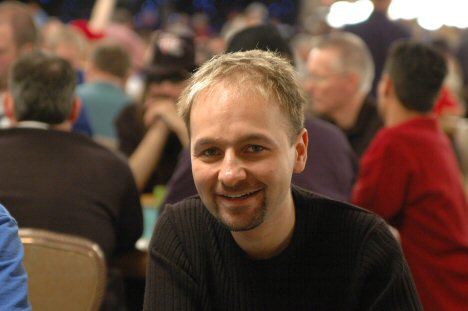
Daniel Negreanu brought $1,000,000 to the table in Season 1

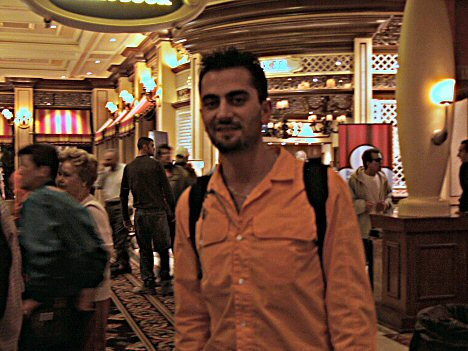
Antonio Esfandiari won $1,000 from Nick Cassavetes after successfully doing 47 push-ups in a Season 5 episode

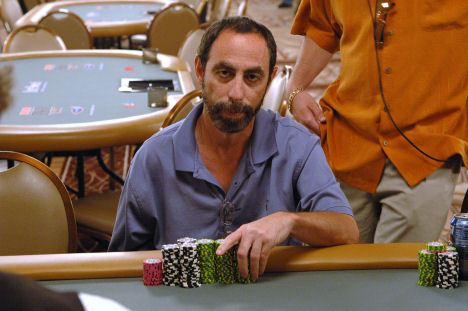
Barry Greenstein raised over $50,000 in charitable donations by uttering the phrase "LOL donkaments" on the show

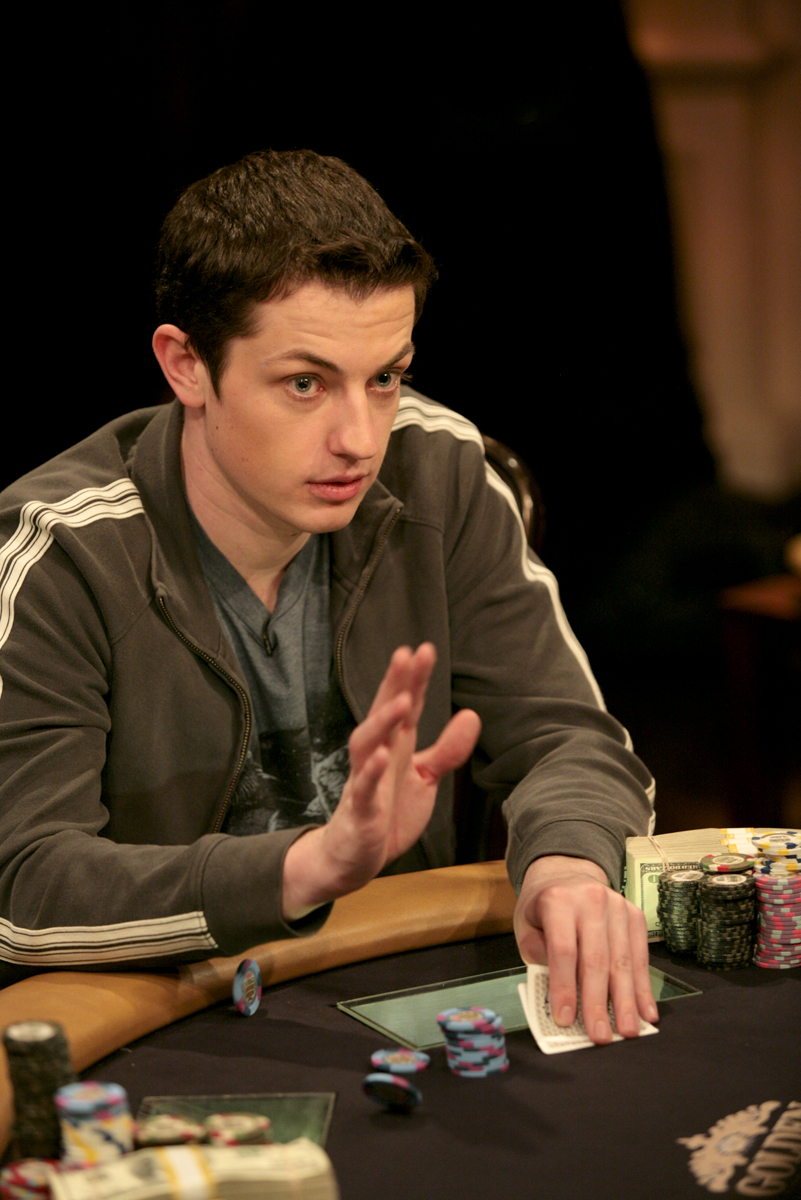
In Season 5, Tom Dwan won a $919,600 pot against Barry Greenstein

Note: Player list accurate through Season 11 episode 13.

Name	Country of birth	Occupation	Season(s)
Brandon Adams	United States	Professor, poker player	4 and 8
Garrett Adelstein	United States	Poker player	9
Daniel Alaei	Iran	Poker player	1-3
Koray Aldemir	Germany	Poker player	9
John Andress	United States	Poker player	8
Patrik Antonius	Finland	Poker player	3-6 and 9
Nikhil Arcot	United States	Poker player	11
Bobby Baldwin	United States	Poker player	10
Mike Baxter	United States	Hedge fund manager	4-5 and 7
Jean-Robert Bellande	United States	Poker player	8-11
David Benyamine	France	Poker player	3-6
Matt Berkey	United States	Poker player	11
Brad Booth	Canada	Poker player	2-3
James Bord	United Kingdom	Businessman, poker player	8-9
Brian Brandon	United States	Options trader	4
Bob Bright	United States	Poker player	11
Doyle Brunson	United States	Poker player	1-7 and 9
Todd Brunson	United States	Poker player	1-4
Jerry Buss	United States	Basketball team owner	1
Nick Cassavetes	United States	Actor, director	5
Fred Chamanara	United States	Restaurant owner	1-2
Johnny Chan	China	Poker player	1 and 7
Bobo Chann	China	Poker player	11
William Chen	United States	Mathematician, poker player	3
Stanley Choi	Hong Kong	Poker player	10
Robert Croak	United States	Businessman	7
John D'Agostino	United States	Poker player	3
Jake Daniels	United States	Poker player	8
Freddy Deeb	Lebanon	Poker player	1
Jonathan Duhamel	Canada	Poker player	7
Tom Dwan	United States	Poker player	5-6 and 8-9
Peter Eastgate	Denmark	Poker player	5
Eli Elezra	Israel	Businessman, poker player	1-6
Antonio Esfandiari	Iran	Poker player	1-7 and 10
Sammy Farha	Lebanon	Poker player	1-4
Chris Ferguson	United States	Poker player	3
Amnon Filippi	United States	Poker player	2
Ted Forrest	United States	Poker player	1-2
Farah Galfond	United States	Poker player	11
Phil Galfond	United States	Poker player	4 and 6-7
Justin Gavri	United States	Poker player	11
Jonathan Gibbs	United States	Businessman	9
Jamie Gold	United States	Poker player	3-4
Barry Greenstein	United States	Poker player	1-7
Bertrand Grospellier	France	Poker player	6
David Grey	United States	Poker player	2
Joe Hachem	Australia	Poker player	5
Matt Hanks	United States	Poker player	10
Gus Hansen	Denmark	Poker player	2 and 6
Jennifer Harman	United States	Poker player	1-4
Dan Harmetz	United States	Businessman	3
Phil Hellmuth	United States	Poker player	1, 4, 6, and 8
Lazaro Hernandez	United States	Businessman, poker player	8
Eric Hicks	United States	Poker player	10
Andreas Høivold	Norway	Poker player	6
Kim Hultman	Sweden	Casino streamer	9
Phil Ivey	United States	Poker player	3, 6, and 8-9
Lynne Ji	United States	Poker player	8 and 11
John Juanda	Indonesia	Poker player	2
Gabe Kaplan	United States	Comedian, actor, poker player	3
Alan Keating	United States	Businessman, poker player	10
Bryn Kenney	United States	Poker player	8-9
Bill Klein	United States	Businessman	7 and 10
Jason Koon	United States	Poker player	8-9 and 11
Phil Laak	Ireland	Poker player	2-7
Guy Laliberté	Canada	Founder of Cirque du Soleil	4
Ben Lamb	United States	Poker player	10
Howard Lederer	United States	Poker player, co-founder of Full Tilt Poker	5
Damien LeForbes	United States	Poker player	8
Erick Lindgren	United States	Poker player	2-3
Xuan Liu	Canada	Poker player	9
Minh Ly	Vietnam	Poker player	2
Mike Matusow	United States	Poker player	2-4 and 6
Alan Meltzer	United States	Record mogul	5
Krish Menon	United States	Businessman	9
Jason Mercier	United States	Poker player	6-7
Dario Minieri	Italy	Poker player	5-6
Michael Mizrachi	United States	Poker player	2
Amir Nasseri	Iran	Physician, poker player	1
Daniel Negreanu	Canada	Poker player	1-7 and 9-10
Chamath Palihapitiya	Sri Lanka	Venture capitalist, engineer, poker player	8
David Peat	United States	Poker player	5 and 7
Bill Perkins	United States	Businessman	7 and 10
Sean Perry	United States	Poker player	8
Eric Persson	United States	Casino owner, poker player	9-11
Nick Petrangelo	United States	Poker player	8
Dennis Phillips	United States	Account manager, poker player	6
Doug Polk	United States	Poker player	8 and 11
Ferdinand Putra	Indonesia	Poker player	11
Victor Ramdin	Guyana	Poker player	3
Chino Rheem	United States	Poker player	10
Andrew Robl	United States	Poker player	6-7 and 10-11
Phil Ruffin	United States	Businessman	7
Bob Safai	United States	Real estate partner	4
Ilari Sahamies	Finland	Poker player	5
Rick Salomon	United States	Poker player, actor, producer	8 and 11
Antonio Salorio	United States	Poker player	4
Robert Sanchez	United States	Poker player	10
Vanessa Selbst	United States	Poker player	7
Michael Schwimer	United States	Former MLB pitcher	8
Dan Shak	United States	Businessman, poker player	3
Shawn Sheikhan	Iran	Poker player	1-3
Sam Simon	United States	Television producer	5
Roger Sippl	United States	Poker player	10
Jeremy Stein	United States	Poker player	10
Brandon Steven	United States	Businessman, poker player	8 and 11
Bob Stupak	United States	Casino owner, poker player	1
Stanley Tang	Hong Kong	DoorDash Co-founder, poker player	9-11
Jennifer Tilly	United States	Actress, poker player	9-11
William Tjokro	Philippines	Poker player	11
Brian Townsend	United States	Poker player	3
Mimi Tran	Vietnam	Poker player	1
Ilya Trincher	Russia	Poker player	3
Haralabos Voulgaris	Canada	Sports bettor, poker player	4 and 7
Lex Veldhuis	Netherlands	Poker player	6
Paul Wasicka	United States	Poker player	3
David Williams	United States	Poker player	3
Rob Yong	England	Casino owner, poker player	11
Charles Yu	China	Businessman, poker player	10-11
Cory Zeidman	United States	Poker player	2
Ema Zajmovic	Bosnia & Herzegovina	Poker player	10
