= High Stakes Poker =

American cash game poker television show

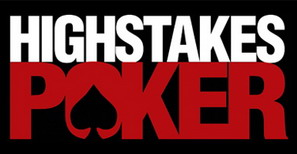
- Presented by: Gabe Kaplan; A. J. Benza; Kara Scott; Norm Macdonald; Nick Schulman
- Country of origin: United States
- Original language: English
- No. of seasons: 15
- No. of episodes: 212

Production
- Producers: Henry Orenstein; Mori Eskandani
- Production location: Nevada
- Running time: 43 minutes

Original release
- Network: GSN
- Release: January 16, 2006 – December 17, 2007
- Release: March 1, 2009 – May 21, 2011
- Network: PokerGO
- Release: December 16, 2020 – present

High Stakes Poker is an American cash game poker television program. The poker variant played on the show is no limit Texas hold 'em. The first four seasons ran from January 16, 2006 to December 17, 2007 on GSN. The next three seasons ran from March 1, 2009 to May 21, 2011, and was simulcast in 3DTV on N3D. The show was revived on December 16, 2020 on PokerGO.

The show was hosted by A. J. Benza in the first five seasons, alongside Gabe Kaplan. In the sixth season, Kara Scott replaced Benza as Kaplan's co-host, with Scott conducting interviews from the poker room floor. In 2011, for the seventh season, Norm Macdonald replaced Kaplan as Scott's co-host. When the series returned in 2020, Benza and Kaplan returned as hosts for the eighth season. After the first episode of the tenth season, Kaplan retired and was replaced by Nick Schulman.

== History ==
The first season of High Stakes Poker, taped at the Golden Nugget in Las Vegas, was first broadcast on January 16, 2006, at 9:00 p.m., and consisted of 13 episodes until April 10, 2006, hosted by A. J. Benza and comedian/actor-turned-poker pro Gabe Kaplan.

The second season, taped at The Palms and consisting of 16 episodes, premiered on June 5, 2006 at 9:00 p.m., and ended on September 18, 2006.

The third season, consisting of 13 episodes, was taped at the South Point Casino at 9:00 p.m. and premiered on January 15, 2007, and ended on April 9, 2007. New players for the third season included Jamie Gold, Phil Ivey, Chris Ferguson, Patrik Antonius, Paul Wasicka, David Benyamine, Brian Townsend, and others. Returning players from previous seasons included Doyle Brunson, Daniel Negreanu, Sammy Farha, Phil Laak, Jennifer Harman, Barry Greenstein, Erick Lindgren, Mike Matusow, Brad Booth, and others.

On April 2, 2007, GSN announced that High Stakes Poker would return for a fourth season, again taped at South Point. Taping was completed in May, with the season premiering on August 27, 2007 at 9:00 p.m. Returning players included Patrik Antonius, David Benyamine, Doyle Brunson, Eli Elezra, Sam Farha, Jamie Gold, Barry Greenstein, Phil Hellmuth Jr., Jennifer Harman, and Daniel Negreanu. Newcomers for the fourth season include Brandon Adams, Mike Baxter, Brian Brandon, Phil Galfond, Guy Laliberté, Bob Safai, Antonio Salorio, and Haralabos Voulgaris. The later episodes of this season featured a $500,000 minimum buy-in (compared to the regular $100,000 minimum) and these games saw more than $5 million in play on the table at one time. Season four finished airing on December 17, 2007, and featured 17 episodes. The network cited the show's strong ratings performance in younger demographics.

Season five, consisting of 13 episodes, ran from March 1, 2009 to May 24, 2009 at 9:00 p.m., was taped at the Golden Nugget on December 19, 2008 to December 21, 2008, and featured a minimum cash buy-in of $200,000. The format for season five differed slightly from its predecessors by having Kaplan and Benza not appear on camera until after the first commercial break in the show rather than at the outset.

Season six premiered at 8:00 p.m. on February 14, 2010, and ended on May 9, 2010, with Kaplan and Kara Scott. It was taped for a second straight season at the Golden Nugget. The sixth season aired with three different groups of players throughout 13 episodes. Tom Dwan and Phil Ivey bought in for $500,000. Other rotating players, including newcomers Jason Mercier, Dennis Phillips, Andrew Robl, and Lex Veldhuis, bought in for $200,000.

Season seven debuted on its new GSN Saturday night time slot at 8:00 p.m. from February 26, 2011 to May 21, 2011. Norm Macdonald replaced Kaplan as the host and Kara Scott conducted interviews from the poker room floor. The season, consisting of 13 episodes, was filmed in December 2010 at the Bellagio in Las Vegas. Sponsored Full Tilt Poker pros were required to boycott the show this time around, as rival site PokerStars became its official sponsors. Thus, "High Stakes Poker" Season 7 is devoid of such Full Tilt pros as Phil Ivey, Jennifer Harman, Tom Dwan, Patrik Antonius, David Benyamine, Mike Matusow, and Eli Elezra. GSN later announced it would be scaling back its airings of High Stakes Poker after PokerStars pulled out of the U.S. market following the indictments in United States v. Scheinberg et al. crackdown on online gambling.

Season eight ran for 14 episodes from December 16, 2020 to March 17, 2021 on the streaming service PokerGO. It was taped at the Aria Resort and Casino. In October 2021, Vice TV began airing episodes from the PokerGO run. Season nine ran from February 21, 2022 to May 23, 2022 for 14 episodes. Season ten ran from January 24, 2023 to May 30, 2023 for 17 episodes. The show aired a special live episode on April 27, 2023. Season eleven ran from August 7, 2023 to November 20, 2023 for 14 episodes. Season twelve ran from February 19, 2024 to May 13, 2024 for 12 episodes.

== Format ==
When it first aired, High Stakes Poker was unique among televised poker series because it did not take place in a tournament setting. Instead, the program showed a high-stakes cash game. The minimum buy-in to the game is $100,000, but players have bought in for as much as $1,000,000, such as Daniel Negreanu in Season 1 and Brad Booth in Season 3. For part of the fourth season, the minimum buy-in was $500,000. The first episode with the minimum $500,000 buy-in was broadcast on November 5, 2007. The minimum cash buy-in for the fifth season increased to $200,000 – the largest buy-in for an entire run of a television series. Unlike in poker tournaments, the chips involved represent real money. If a player loses his or her initial buy-in, that player may rebuy a minimum of $50,000. In addition, players may use cash instead of casino chips. Cash plays and stays as cash in the pot, it does not have to be converted into casino chips. Unlike tournament poker, blinds and antes are constant, instead of increasing as time goes on. High Stakes Poker has $300/$600 blinds with a $100 ante. The fourth season features three forced blinds of $300, $600, and $1,200, with a "straddle" or optional fourth blind of $2,400.

The players include poker professionals along with amateurs such as Jerry Buss and Fred Chamanara. The show was created by executive producer Henry Orenstein. In season one, Daniel Negreanu confirmed in a post on his website's forums that all players were paid $1,250 per hour for taking part and that 13 episodes were edited down from 24 hours of actual play. 2006 WSOP Main Event Champion Jamie Gold commented that players were paid for participating, though they had to put much more money at risk to get to play the game. Gold also spoke about his interactions with other players, particularly Mike Matusow. The theme song for the show is titled "I'm All In", written and performed by John Pratt.

== Notable hands ==
=== Large pots ===
In Season 2, Gus Hansen won $575,700 with four fives, beating Daniel Negreanu's full house. Hansen raised to $2,100 with 5♦ 5♣, and Negreanu re-raised to $5,000 with 6♠ 6♥, which Hansen called. The pot was $11,700, and the flop came 9♣ 6♦ 5♥. Hansen checked his set of fives with a 4% chance of winning the hand, and Negreanu bet $8,000 with his set of sixes and a 94% chance of winning. Hansen raised to $26,000 and Negreanu called, bringing the pot to $63,700. The turn came 5♠, making Hansen quad fives, leaving Negreanu a 2% underdog with his full house. Hansen bet $24,000, and Negreanu called, slow playing his full house. The pot was now $111,700. The river came 8♠. Hansen checked, and Negreanu bet $65,000. Hansen then went all in for his remaining $232,000, bringing the pot to $408,700. Negreanu called, and Hansen won the pot of $575,700. This was the largest pot before the $500,000 minimum buy-in game played during Season 4.

In the November 12, 2007, episode of Season 4, Jamie Gold won $495,867 of a $743,800 pot that developed between Gold with three Kings on the turn card, and Patrik Antonius with a straight on the turn card. Antonius held A♠ J♦ and Gold had pocket K. After the 3♠ Q♦ 10♥ flop and K♥ turn, Antonius was a 4-to-1 favorite with his straight vs. Gold's three kings. Gold moved all-in and Antonius called. With such a large amount at stake, the players agreed to run the river (deal the river card) three times. The first river card, Q♥, and the second river run, 3♦, both paired the board to give two wins to Gold with a full house. The third river run, 8♠, kept Antonius' straight in front. As a result, Gold won $495,867 from the pot and Antonius won $247,933. Antonius' calm demeanor after the hand prompted host A.J. Benza to comment, "I'll tell you one thing: Patrik can take a punch. Imagine if that was Phil Hellmuth."

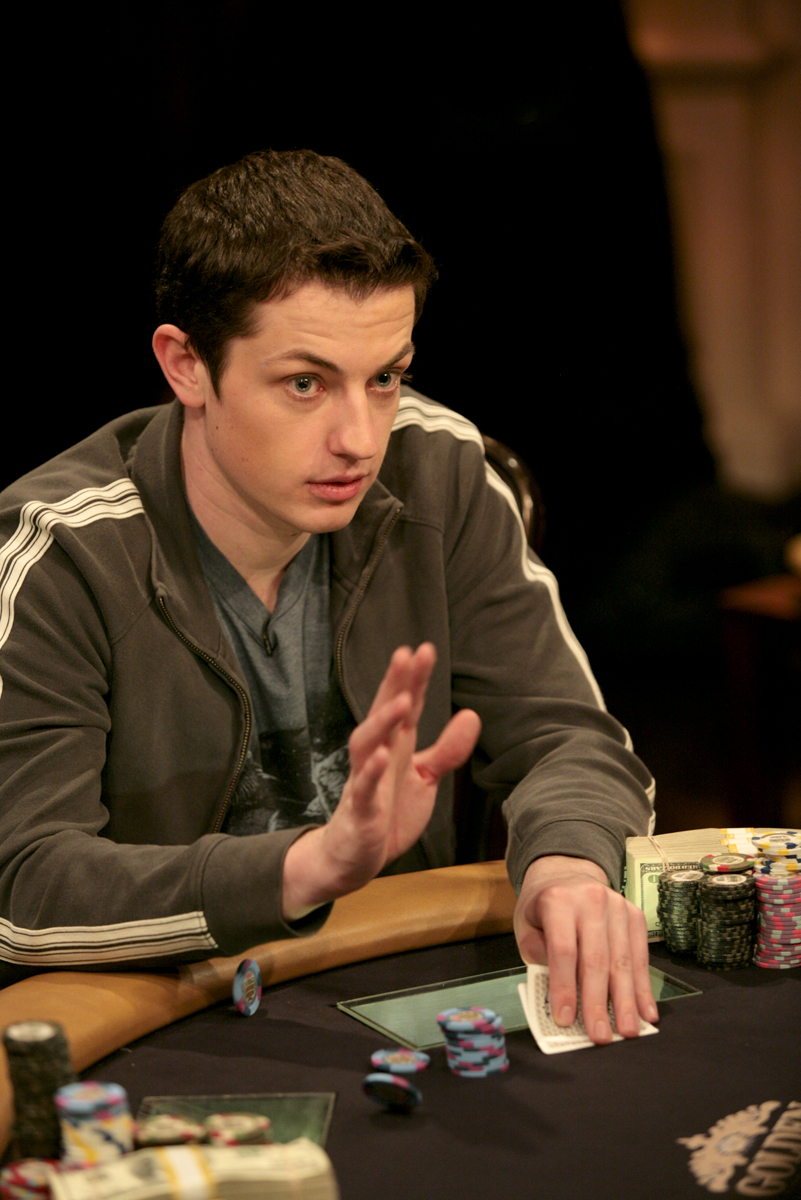
In Season 5, Tom Dwan (pictured) won a $919,600 pot against Barry Greenstein

In the November 26, 2007 episode of Season 4, Doyle Brunson won a $818,100 pot against Guy Laliberté. Brunson held A♦ 10♦ and Laliberté A♥ 5♥. The flop came A♣ J♠ 4♦ and the turn was 2♦. Brunson bet the turn, and Laliberte raised and Brunson moved all-in and was called. The players agreed to run the river twice. Brunson was a 75% favorite with his better kicker and flush draw, and he won both times to take the entire pot. After the hand, Brunson said, "When you don't make a pair for eight hours, you go crazy."

Later in that same November 26, 2007, episode of Season 4, Patrik Antonius won $749,100 from a $998,800 pot that developed between Antonius with a pair of nines on the flop, and Sammy Farha with a king-high flush draw. Antonius went all-in after the flop and Farha called. The odds were roughly even, and the players agreed to run the turn and river four times. Antonius won three times to take three-quarters of the pot, $749,100, while Farha won $249,700.

In Season 4, Guy Laliberté and David Benyamine created a pot of $1,227,900 — the largest in High Stakes Poker history — before negotiating a reduction of the pot to "only" $238,900. David had A♣ 8♣ and Laliberté had K♦ 5♦ and the flop came K♣ 3♦ 5♣ giving Laliberté top two pair and Benyamine the nut flush draw. Acting after Farha, Benyamine raised to $43,000 and Laliberté reraised to $168,000. Farha folded his A♥ 3♠, Benyamine went all-in, and Laliberté called, bringing the pot to $1,227,900. After turning the respective cards over, Laliberté, knowing he was the favorite, offered to run it once or twice. After further negotiation, Laliberté offered to take the pot previous to the raises of $238,900. Benyamine agreed. Antonio Esfandiari and a couple of other players wanted to see the turn and river, but Laliberté and Benyamine refused.

In Season 5, Tom Dwan won the biggest pot — $919,600 — to be played straight up (with no side-deals or multiple runs). Dwan won with three Queens, beating Barry Greenstein's two pair – Aces and Queens. Peter Eastgate was the original raiser with A♠ K♥, with Greenstein re-raising to $15,000 with A♦ A♣, Dwan calling with K♠ Q♠ and Eastgate calling behind him. The flop came 4♠ 2♠ Q♥, causing Dwan to bet on his pair of Queens and a King high flush draw, Eastgate to fold, Greenstein to raise with his pair of Aces and backdoor straight draw, Dwan to reraise, and finally Greenstein to push all-in, which Dwan quickly called. Greenstein had turned down Dwan's offer to run it twice on an earlier hand (in which Dwan had the best hand when they went all-in, though Greenstein ultimately won), and this time Greenstein again wanted to run it only once, but offered to take some of their money back, which Dwan turned down stating "sorry...no" Commentator Gabe Kaplan noted the comparison with the earlier hand when Greenstein would not run it twice. At this point, it was almost an exactly even race. The turn was the Q♣, and the river the 7♦, so Dwan won the pot of $919,600.

=== Large bluffs ===
In Season 3, Brad Booth with 4♠ 2♠ executed a successful bluff against Phil Ivey, (then) leading with K♥ K♦, in a pot that stood at $31,100 pre-flop. The flop came 3♦ 7♠ 6♦, Ivey's overpair was a 79% favorite to Booth's inside straight draw and backdoor flush draw. After Ivey bet $23,000 on the flop to make the pot $54,100, Booth raised to $300,000. Ivey folded.

At the beginning of Season 4, the players agreed that anyone who won a pot while holding the weakest possible hold 'em hand (2–7) would be paid $500 by every other player at the table. This led to several five-figure bluffs that were calculated to pick up the $3,500 bonus (and the respect of the table). Phil Hellmuth won the 7-2 bonus in the second televised hand of the season, making a $40,000 bet on the river that caused Mike Matusow to lay down pocket Kings.

The biggest unsuccessful bluff occurred as a result of this $500 for 2–7 rule. Amateurs Antonio Salorio and Brian Brandon went to a raised flop with 2–7 and K-K respectively. When Brandon flopped the best possible hand with K-4-K, Salorio continued to bet hard on his 2–7 bluff, eventually losing more than $100,000 of his own bets before giving up when Brandon raised on the turn.

In Season 5, Tom Dwan executed a successful bluff against Barry Greenstein and Peter Eastgate in a pot that stood at $133,500 pre-bluff. Dwan won with a pair of tens against Barry Greenstein's higher pair of Aces and Peter Eastgate's (then) leading trip deuces. Greenstein, with A♥ A♣, opened the play under the gun to $2,500 and was quickly called by all players. Before the flop came out there was $21,400 in the pot and at this point, Dwan jokingly offered to chop the pot. The flop was 2♣ 10♦ 2♠. Eastgate, with trip deuces on his 2♦ 4♥, and Doyle Brunson with A♠ 9♣, both checked. Greenstein led out with $10,000 after some thought, and with seven people behind him, Dwan raised the pot to $37,300. David Benyamine (3♦ 3♣), Eli Elezra (J♦ 9♠), Ilari Sahamies (7♥ 6♠) and Daniel Negreanu (K♦ 4♦) all quickly folded. The action came back to Eastgate, who called, as did Greenstein. With the pot already at $133,500, the turn came a 7♦, and Eastgate and Greenstein quickly checked. After some thought, Dwan (a 95% underdog at this point) bet $104,200, causing Eastgate and Greenstein to reluctantly fold. Following the hand, Dwan was quick to announce he was bluffing by stating, "Peter had the best hand, I'll make a sidebet that Peter had the best hand." Doyle Brunson accepted, and eventually lost $9,000 when Peter, after a $1,000 bribe from Dwan, announced he had a trip deuces a few episodes later. After the hand was done, commentator Gabe Kaplan said that the only other person he knew who would have made a similar move was "maybe the late Stu Ungar.”

In Season 6, Tom Dwan executed a successful bluff against Phil Ivey in a pot that stood at $408,700 pre-bluff. Tom Dwan (8♠ 9♠) raised $25,000 preflop and got called by Phil Ivey with (A♦ 6♦). After a flop of (10♦ Q♣ K♦), Dwan fired another $45,800 and Ivey called, making the pot $162,300. The turn came (3♠), and Dwan fired again, this time $123,200. Ivey again called with his flush and inside straight draws, creating a pot of $408,700. The river came (6♣), leaving Ivey with a small pair and Dwan with 9 high. Dwan bet another $268,200. Ivey considered calling for over 3 minutes (according to the TV show), but ultimately folded.

In Season 7, amateur player Bill Klein opted to see the river in a $192,800 pot, by calling the re-raise to $67,000 by professional Phil Galfond of his $28,000 bet. Klein held 10♠ 6♠ for a flush draw, and Galfond, holding Q♠ 10♥, had a straight on a board that read J♠ 9♥ 2♠ K♣. The river card was the J♥, which prompted Klein to take a glance at Galfond from under his hat. "Looks like Klein's creative juices may be flowing", quipped commentator Norm Macdonald, as Klein slid a tower of 30 $5,000 chips forward equalling $150,000. After Galfond folded, Bill Klein showed the bluff and received a standing ovation and fist-bumps from around the table.

=== Quick loss ===
In a single episode of Season 6, Daniel Negreanu lost a total of $380,000 in two hands, both to Mike Matusow. In the first hand, Negreanu went all-in on trip nines, holding 9♣ 8♣ on a 9♦ K♠ 9♥ board. Matusow, however, had flopped a full house since he held K♦ K♣. In the second hand, Matusow went all-in as the favorite on a flop of 6♥ 4♣ 7♣ holding A♣ Q♣ for a flush draw and two overcards. Negreanu called with 10♥ 10♣. The players agreed to run the turn and river twice; Matusow completed the flush both times.

== Episodes ==
=== Season 1 (2006) ===
Season 1 was taped at the Golden Nugget in Las Vegas, Nevada.

Episodes	Seat 1	Seat 2	Seat 3	Seat 4	Seat 5	Seat 6	Seat 7	Seat 8
1-5	Jerry Buss	Daniel Negreanu	Barry Greenstein	Doyle Brunson / Todd Brunson	Jennifer Harman	Ted Forrest / Eli Elezra	Daniel Alaei / Sammy Farha	Amir Nasseri / Shawn Sheikhan
6-9	Johnny Chan	Daniel Negreanu	Eli Elezra / Mimi Tran	Doyle Brunson / Todd Brunson	Sammy Farha	Fred Chamanara / Bob Stupak	Freddy Deeb	Amir Nasseri / Shawn Sheikhan
10-13	Doyle Brunson / Todd Brunson	Eli Elezra / Jennifer Harman	Barry Greenstein	Phil Hellmuth	Shawn Sheikhan / Johnny Chan	Daniel Negreanu	Antonio Esfandiari	Freddy Deeb / Jerry Buss

=== Season 2 (2006) ===
Season 2 was taped at The Palms in Las Vegas, Nevada.

Episodes	Seat 1	Seat 2	Seat 3	Seat 4	Seat 5	Seat 6	Seat 7	Seat 8
1-8	Daniel Negreanu	Michael Mizrachi / Jennifer Harman	Fred Chamanara / Antonio Esfandiari	Mike Matusow	Phil Laak / Todd Brunson	Antonio Esfandiari / Brad Booth	Daniel Alaei / Minh Ly	Sammy Farha / Phil Laak
9-16	Doyle Brunson / Phil Laak	Eli Elezra / Brad Booth	Antonio Esfandiari / David Grey	Shawn Sheikhan / Gus Hansen / Ted Forrest	Daniel Negreanu	Cory Zeidman / Erick Lindgren	Barry Greenstein	Amnon Filippi / John Juanda

=== Season 3 (2007) ===
Season 3 was taped at South Point in Las Vegas, Nevada.

Episodes	Seat 1	Seat 2	Seat 3	Seat 4	Seat 5	Seat 6	Seat 7	Seat 8
1-8	Mike Matusow / Brian Townsend	Jamie Gold / Sammy Farha / Phil Laak	Daniel Alaei / Todd Brunson	Shawn Sheikhan / Paul Wasicka	Victor Ramdin / Barry Greenstein	Daniel Negreanu / Gabe Kaplan / Eli Elezra	Bill Chen / Jennifer Harman	Doyle Brunson / Erick Lindgren
9-13	Daniel Negreanu	Dan Harmetz / David Williams / Patrik Antonius	Illya Trincher / Brad Booth	Phil Laak / David Benyamine	Antonio Esfandiari	Chris Ferguson / Phil Ivey	Mike Matusow / John D'Agostino	Dan Shak / Brian Townsend

=== Season 4 (2007) ===
Season 4 was taped at South Point in Las Vegas, Nevada.

Episodes	Seat 1	Seat 2	Seat 3	Seat 4	Seat 5	Seat 6	Seat 7	Seat 8
1-3	Haralabos Voulgaris	Antonio Esfandiari / Mike Baxter	Tony Salorio	Phil Hellmuth	Mike Matusow	Phil Laak	Brian Brandon / Bob Safai	Todd Brunson
4-10	Eli Elezra	Daniel Negreanu	Phil Hellmuth	Jennifer Harman	Sammy Farha / Brandon Adams	Mike Baxter / Sammy Farha	Jamie Gold	Bob Safai / Phil Galfond
11-17	Antonio Esfandiari	Sammy Farha	David Benyamine	Patrik Antonius	Guy Laliberte	Jamie Gold / Daniel Negreanu	Doyle Brunson	Barry Greenstein

=== Season 5 (2009) ===
Season 5 was taped at the Golden Nugget in Las Vegas, Nevada.

Episodes	Seat 1	Seat 2	Seat 3	Seat 4	Seat 5	Seat 6	Seat 7	Seat 8
1-6	Daniel Negreanu	Peter Eastgate	Doyle Brunson	Barry Greenstein	Tom Dwan	David Benyamine	Eli Elezra	Ilari Sahamies
7-10	Sam Simon / Tom Dwan	Joe Hachem	Nick Cassavetes	Daniel Negreanu	Antonio Esfandiari	Patrik Antonius	Phil Laak	Howard Lederer
11-13	Mike Baxter	Eli Elezra	Doyle Brunson	Dario Minieri	Phil Laak	David Peat	Tom Dwan	Alan Meltzer

=== Season 6 (2010) ===
Season 6 was taped at the Golden Nugget in Las Vegas, Nevada.

Episodes	Seat 1	Seat 2	Seat 3	Seat 4	Seat 5	Seat 6	Seat 7	Seat 8
1-5	Phil Hellmuth / Eli Elezra	Phil Ivey	Andreas Hoivold / Jason Mercier	Daniel Negreanu	Gus Hansen	Tom Dwan	Antonio Esfandiari	Dario Minieri / Phil Laak
6-8	Dennis Phillips	Tom Dwan	Barry Greenstein	Phil Ivey	Andrew Robl	Patrik Antonius	Daniel Negreanu	Lex Veldhuis
9-13	Daniel Negreanu	Eli Elezra	Tom Dwan	Doyle Brunson	Mike Matusow / Lex Veldhuis	David Benyamine	Bertrand Grospellier	Phil Ivey / Phil Galfond

=== Season 7 (2011) ===
Season 7 was taped at the Bellagio in Las Vegas, Nevada.

Episodes	Seat 1	Seat 2	Seat 3	Seat 4	Seat 5	Seat 6	Seat 7	Seat 8
1-5	Doyle Brunson	Vanessa Selbst	Barry Greenstein	Antonio Esfandiari	Robert Croak / Andrew Robl	Phil Ruffin / Johnny Chan	Bill Klein	David Peat
6-9	Haralabos Voulgaris	Phil Laak	Mike Baxter	Jonathan Duhamel	Jason Mercier	Julian Movsesian	Bill Perkins	Barry Greenstein
10-13	Johnny Chan	Phil Galfond	Antonio Esfandiari / Daniel Negreanu	Erik Boneta	Robert Croak / Barry Greenstein	Bill Klein	Doyle Brunson	Phil Laak

=== Season 8 (2020–21) ===
Season 8 was taped at the ARIA Resort & Casino in Las Vegas, Nevada.

Episodes	Seat 1	Seat 2	Seat 3	Seat 4	Seat 5	Seat 6	Seat 7	Seat 8
1-5	Michael Schwimer / Lynne Ji	Jean-Robert Bellande	Bryn Kenney	Rick Salomon	Brandon Steven	Tom Dwan	Nick Petrangelo	
6-8	Tom Dwan	Sean Perry	Damien LeForbes	Jean-Robert Bellande	Michael Schwimer	Rick Salomon / Bryn Kenney	John Andress	
9-11	Phil Hellmuth	James Bord	Lazaro Hernandez	Jake Daniels	Phil Ivey / Jason Koon	Chamath Palihapitiya	Tom Dwan	Brandon Steven
12-14	Brandon Steven	James Bord	Jake Daniels	Tom Dwan	Doug Polk / Rick Salomon	Phil Ivey / John Andress	Bryn Kenney	Phil Hellmuth

=== Season 9 (2022) ===
Season 9 was taped at the ARIA Resort & Casino in Las Vegas, Nevada.

Episodes	Seat 1	Seat 2	Seat 3	Seat 4	Seat 5	Seat 6	Seat 7	Seat 8
1-3	Phil Ivey	Kim Hultman / Jonathan Gibbs	Koray Aldemir	Doyle Brunson	James Bord / Jean-Robert Bellande	Tom Dwan	Patrik Antonius	Daniel Negreanu
4-6	Kim Hultman	Garrett Adelstein	Xuan Liu	Tom Dwan	Doyle Brunson	Jennifer Tilly	Patrik Antonius	Krish Menon
7-9	Tom Dwan	Jean-Robert Bellande	Phil Ivey	Bryn Kenney	Krish Menon	Jennifer Tilly	Garrett Adelstein	Daniel Negreanu
10-12	Patrik Antonius	Bryn Kenney	Tom Dwan	Phil Ivey / John Andress	Garrett Adelstein	Stanley Tang	Krish Menon	Eric Persson
13-14	Jason Koon	Daniel Negreanu	Stanley Tang	Phil Ivey	Doyle Brunson	Tom Dwan	Patrik Antonius	Jonathan Gibbs

=== Season 10 (2023) ===
Season 10 was taped at the ARIA Resort & Casino in Las Vegas, Nevada.

Episodes	Seat 1	Seat 2	Seat 3	Seat 4	Seat 5	Seat 6	Seat 7
1-4	Matt Hanks	Chino Rheem	Bobby Baldwin	Eric Persson	Jennifer Tilly	Jean-Robert Bellande	Ema Zajmovic
5-8	Roger Sippl	Antonio Esfandiari	Bobby Baldwin	Jennifer Tilly	Robert Sanchez	Bill Perkins	
9-12	Stanley Tang	Eric Persson	Stanley Choi	Jennifer Tilly	Daniel Negreanu	Andrew Robl	Jean-Robert Bellande
13-14	Jean-Robert Bellande	Jeremy Stein	Stanley Tang	Eric Hicks	Alan Keating	Stanley Choi	
15-17	Stanley Choi	Eric Hicks	Bill Klein	Eric Persson	Charles Yu	Daniel Negreanu	Ben Lamb

=== Season 11 (2023) ===
Season 11 was taped at the ARIA Resort & Casino in Las Vegas, Nevada.

Episodes	Seat 1	Seat 2	Seat 3	Seat 4	Seat 5	Seat 6	Seat 7	Seat 8
1-3	Eric Persson	Jean-Robert Bellande	Charles Yu	Andrew Robl	Rob Yong	Ferdinand Putra	Rick Salomon	
4-6	Jean-Robert Bellande	Andrew Robl	Ferdinand Putra	Rob Yong	Rick Salomon	Charles Yu		
7-8	Stanley Tang	William Tjokro	Bob Bright	Jean-Robert Bellande / Rick Salomon	Jennifer Tilly	Rob Yong	Andrew Robl	
9	Farah Galfond	Rob Yong	Stanley Tang	Ferdinand Putra	Jennifer Tilly	Matt Berkey	Jason Koon	
10-12	Rob Yong	Brandon Steven	Bobo Chann	Rick Salomon	Jennifer Tilly	Jean-Robert Bellande	Justin Gavri	
13-14	Jean-Robert Bellande	Doug Polk	Matt Berkey	Nik Airball	Lynne Ji	Jennifer Tilly	Eric Persson	Rob Yong

=== Season 12 (2024) ===
Season 12 was taped at the ARIA Resort & Casino in Las Vegas, Nevada.

Episodes	Seat 1	Seat 2	Seat 3	Seat 4	Seat 5	Seat 6	Seat 7	Seat 8
1-2	Vivian Yang	Justin Gavri	Andrew Pacheco	Andrew Sasson	Jennifer Tilly	Jean-Robert Bellande	Andrew Robl	Santhosh Suvarna
3-5	Jean-Robert Bellande / Chino Rheem	Santhosh Suvarna	Nik Airball	Andrew Robl	Phil Laak	Vivian Yang	Justin Gavri / Jean-Robert Bellande	Brandon Adams
6-8	Brandon Adams	Stanley Tang	Santhosh Suvarna	Justin Gavri	Andrew Robl	Nik Airball	Charles Yu	
9-12	Santhosh Suvarna	Charles Yu	Nik Airball	Brandon Adams	Andrew Robl	Stanley Tang		

=== Season 13 (2024) ===
Season 13 was taped at the ARIA Resort & Casino in Las Vegas, Nevada.

Episodes	Seat 1	Seat 2	Seat 3	Seat 4	Seat 5	Seat 6	Seat 7	Seat 8
1-2	Andrew Robl	Bo Brownstein	Masato Yokosawa	Sameh Elamawy	Jennifer Tilly	Sean Dempsey	Justin Gavri	
3-5	Andrew Robl	Brandon Steven	Sameh Elamawy	Bo Brownstein	Jennifer Tilly	Masato Yokosawa	Justin Gavri	Andrew Pacheco
6-10	Stanley Tang	Andrew Robl	Sameh Elamawy	Humboldt Mike	Jennifer Tilly	Nik Airball	Justin Gavri	Brandon Steven
11-12	Chamath Palihapitiya	Nik Airball	Sameh Elamawy	Stanley Tang	Jennifer Tilly	Jeff Housenbold	Andrew Robl	Phil Hellmuth

=== Season 14 (2025) ===
Season 14 was taped at the ARIA Resort & Casino in Las Vegas, Nevada.

Episodes	Seat 1	Seat 2	Seat 3	Seat 4	Seat 5	Seat 6	Seat 7
1-3	Markus Gonsalves	Andrew Robl	Brandon Steven	Seth Gottlieb	Marc Kulick	Jared Bleznick	Justin Gavri
3-6	Ryan Feldman	Marc Kulick	David Phan	Steve Swedlow	Peter Wang	Britney Wang	Alan Keating
7-8	Phil Hellmuth	Scott Seiver	Markus Gonsalves	Justin Gavri	Jared Bleznick	Seth Gottlieb	Kento Mori
9-11	Rick Salomon	Alan Keating	Justin Gavri	Peter Wang	Nik Airball	Vinny Lingham	
12-14	Rick Salomon	Justin Gavri	Peter Wang	Sam Kiki	Nik Airball	Alan Keating	

=== Season 15 (2025) ===
Season 15 was taped at the ARIA Resort & Casino in Las Vegas, Nevada.

Episodes	Seat 1	Seat 2	Seat 3	Seat 4	Seat 5	Seat 6	Seat 7
1-5	Stanley Tang	Andrew Robl	Kevin Hart	Sameh Elamawy	Sam Kiki / Andrew Sasson	Darin Feinstein / Justin Gavri	Kirk Brown
6-8	Justin Gavri	Andrew Robl	Sameh Elamawy	Sean Dempsey	Antonio Esfandiari	Stanley Tang	Darin Feinstein
9-11	Justin Gavri	Steve Swedlow	Jeremy Stein	Sameh Elamawy	Professor	Eric Hicks	Andrew Robl
12-14	Andrew Robl	Justin Gavri	Sameh Elamawy	Jon Isaac	Jennifer Tilly / Tim Robl	Steve Swedlow	Sean Dempsey
15-17	Steve Swedlow	Andrew Pacheco	Nik Airball	Justin Gavri	Andrew Robl	Jon Isaac	Professor

== Players ==
These players appeared in the first seven seasons: Doyle Brunson, Antonio Esfandiari, Barry Greenstein, and Daniel Negreanu. None of them returned for the eighth season, while only Phil Hellmuth, Tom Dwan, Phil Ivey, and Brandon Adams appeared in both the original High Stakes Poker, and season 8.

== Key sponsors ==
Most seasons included a key sponsor. Over the years, they included notable companies like PokerStars, Full Tilt Poker, and Bellagio. The eighth and ninth seasons were sponsored by Poker King, an online poker app focused on the Asian market. Season 10 was sponsored by PokerGO Hold'em, while Season 11 sponsors included StormX, True Classic, and Solve for Why. Season 12 sponsors included StormX and GTO Wizard, while Season 13, 14, and 15 sponsors included StormX, GTO Wizard, and Monkey Tilt.

== See also ==
- List of television shows set in Las Vegas
- Poker After Dark
