= Viktor Blom =

Swedish poker player (born 1990)

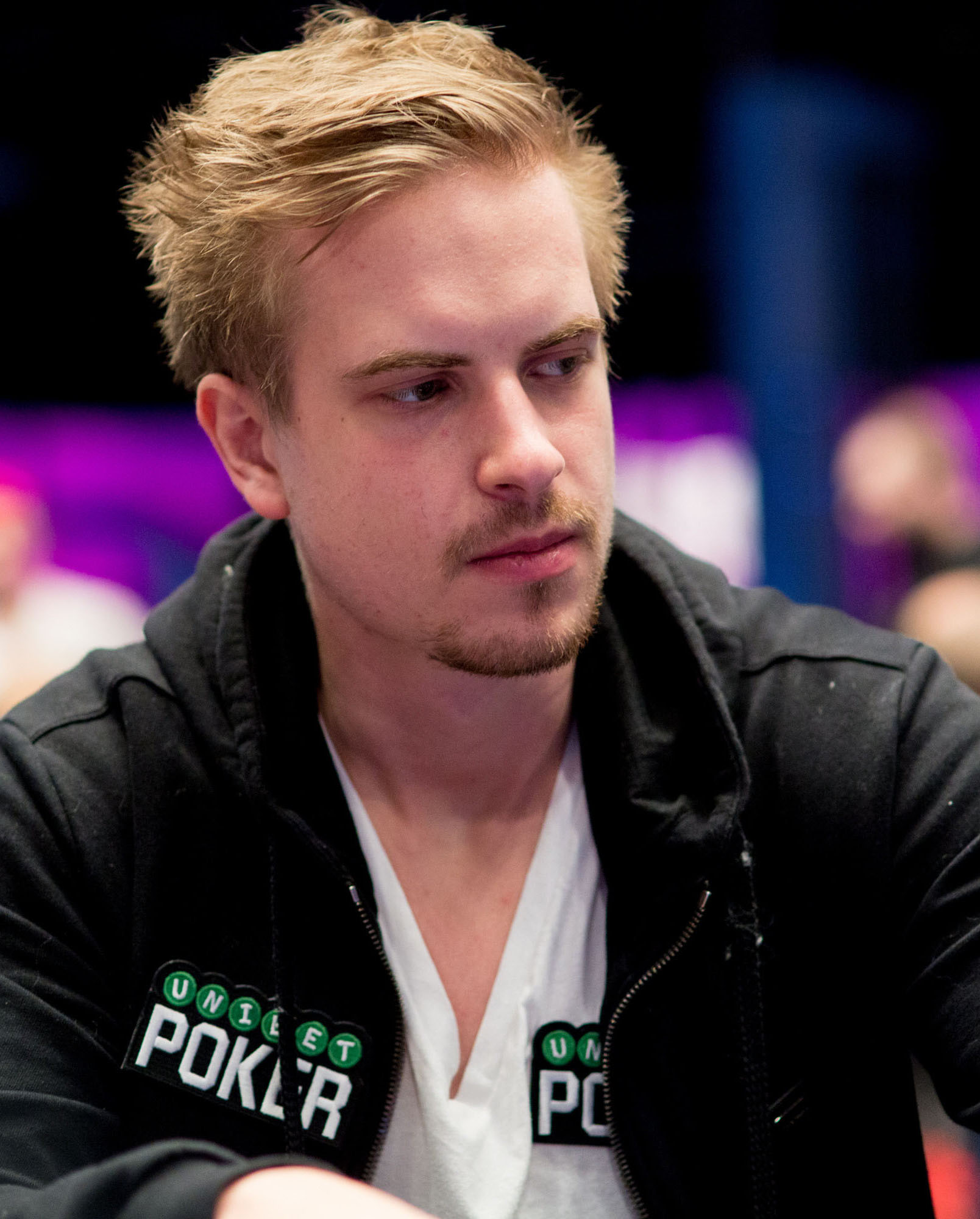
- Viktor "Isildur1" Blom playing in a Poker tournament (2015)
- Nicknames: Isildur1 blom90
- Born: 26 September 1990 (age 36); Gothenburg, Sweden

World Series of Poker
- Bracelet: None
- Money finishes: 23
- Highest WSOP Main Event finish: 272nd, 2025

European Poker Tour
- Title: None
- Final table: None
- Money finishes: 3

Viktor Blom (born 26 September 1990) is a Swedish high-stakes online poker player, best known by the online poker name Isildur1. His rise to fame drew considerable attention around the poker world in late 2009, when he took part in all ten of the largest pots in online poker history. In December 2010, it was announced that then-anonymous Isildur1 had joined Team PokerStars Pro. Blom's identity was revealed by PokerStars on 8 January 2011, at the PokerStars Caribbean Adventure. Blom parted ways with PokerStars in August 2012 and was quickly signed-up by Full Tilt Poker on 15 October 2012, along with rival high-stakes player Tom Dwan.

== Career ==
Viktor Blom was first introduced to poker by his older brother at 14 years old. He played no-limit Texas hold'em heads-up for a few days with his brother before teaching a few of his friends. Viktor and these friends used to play micro stakes, in which he won a bit from his friends. After a while, more and more of the people Viktor knew at school started to play the game. They played at breaks during school with buy-ins ranging from $3–$7, during one lunch Viktor recalls that 25 people turned up to play. Viktor himself ended up winning out of the 25. After turning 15, Viktor and his brother decided to deposit some money onto an online poker site. The first game they entered was an MTT in which they finished in fifth place for $300, which was huge for them at the time. After a few weeks, Viktor's brother decided to set up his own account elsewhere and let Viktor play by himself.

After a few weeks of play, Blom90 was regularly playing at $530 sit n gos. After a few more months of play, the 15-year-old Viktor Blom had made over $275,000 total at various sites. He then collected all the money onto one site and took on the higher buy-in cash games and sit n gos. This resulted in him losing all the money. He then built up a bankroll and deposited $3,000 onto the same site. He played high buy-in sit n gos and started to win more and more money.

After taking a small break from poker, Viktor came back strong. He deposited 10,000 SEK and decided to stick to heads-up no-limit Hold'em. After just two weeks of play, he went from playing 1/2 SEK to 50/100 SEK. After Viktor turned 17, he deposited $2,500 on PartyPoker. He discussed his plans with a friend and off he went. Two days later, the friend asked him how much he had on PartyPoker, expecting him to say he had busted out or had at most $30,000. He was wrong. Blom had actually won over $200,000 in just two days of play. After another hot streak on iPoker, he won over $1.7 million in two weeks.

=== Isildur1 ===
Isildur1 first appeared at Full Tilt Poker on 16 September 2009, and remained largely unnoticed until November, when he began playing well-known professionals such as Tom Dwan, Phil Ivey, Brian Townsend, Cole South, and Patrik Antonius at stakes as high as $500/$1000. He reached a career peak on 15 November with total winnings of $5.98 million. By mid-December, however, he was down $2 million net, including an approximately $4 million loss to Brian Hastings on 8 December, when the two played heads-up $500/$1,000 pot-limit Omaha for five hours. With a few brief exceptions, Isildur1 did not play on Full Tilt Poker between his collapse in mid-December and his return in February 2010.

According to Full Tilt Poker's insider interview with Patrik Antonius, Isildur1 had a bankroll of approximately $2000 in autumn of 2008. He built his bankroll to $1.4 million and began playing on Full Tilt Poker in September. He first played Haseeb Qureshi, a high-stakes regular, at the $100/$200 stakes. After 24 hours, Isildur1 had won almost $500,000. He then resurfaced a month later and played Brian Townsend, Patrik Antonius, and Cole South at the $200/$400 to $500/$1000 tables and suffered a million dollar loss. A columnist on HighStakesDB, a website that monitors and tracks high-stakes activity online, suggested that Isildur1 was overly aggressive, which could cost him against elite competition. Isildur1, however, answered critics by winning approximately $2 million back from Townsend and South during the last week of October 2009.

With a profit of $1 million on Full Tilt Poker, Isildur1 waited at six heads-up $500/$1000 No Limit Hold'em tables for any challenger willing to play for such stakes. His first opponent was Tom Dwan, who was then widely regarded as one of the top online heads-up players. They played six tables simultaneously, with over a million dollars in play for one week. By the end of the week, Isildur1 had gone on the largest run in the history of online poker, winning approximately $4 million from Dwan, prompting Dwan to issue a live challenge to play Isildur1 at the Full Tilt Poker Durrrr Million Dollar Challenge. He then challenged Antonius to a rematch the following day and won $1.6 million from him on 15 November and peaked with $5.98 million in earnings on Full Tilt Poker.

Isildur1 challenged Phil Ivey, widely regarded as one of the best all-round players in the world, to play three tables of heads-up no-limit hold’em at $500/$1000 stakes. After a week of play, Isildur1 had lost $3.2 million and stated in a subsequent interview that Ivey was the toughest opponent he had ever played.

Antonius then challenged Isildur1 to a rematch in Omaha, a game in which Isildur1 admitted he lacked experience. Isildur1 lost $3 million to Antonius after playing for only one day, which at the time, was the largest single-day gain and loss in the history of online poker. This record was broken a month later when Isildur1 played Brian Hastings. The following day, they played a rematch in Omaha, where Isildur1 won $2 million back from Antonius.

His winnings hovered at the $2 million mark until 8 December 2009, when he played Brian Hastings for five hours. Hastings won $4.2 million from Isildur1, making it the largest gain and loss in a single day in the history of online poker to date.

It was discovered afterward that Hastings, Townsend, and South had shared information about Isildur1's play over 30,000 hands. They engaged in activity which Full Tilt Poker defined as "accessing or compiling information on other players beyond that which the user has personally observed through his or her own game play", after Townsend admitted to acquiring hands of Isildur1's play through Hastings, which he spoke of during an interview with ESPN. As a result, Townsend lost some of his privileges as a sponsored Full Tilt Poker player (his "red pro status") for 30 days. Blom's play on Full Tilt Poker between September 2009 and October 2010 at stakes of 50/100 and above resulted in a loss of $2,630,230.

In December 2010, he partnered with online poker site PokerStars and launched a four-table of heads-up cash game no-limit hold'em and pot limit Omaha "Superstar Showdown" challenge to anyone who is willing to play at stakes no lower than $50/$100 for 2,500 hands, similar to Dwan's Durrrr Million Dollar Challenge. In March 2012, he defeated Isaac Haxton in a $1 million $200/$400 heads up challenge, winning $500,000.

On 7 May 2012, Blom won the SCOOP #2-Med No-Limit Hold 'em tournament and $247,200 in prize money. The very next day, Blom won the SCOOP #3-High No-Limit Hold 'em Rebuy event for $160,000. In May 2013, Viktor won the SCOOP Main Event $10,300 buy-in for over $1 million.

In August 2012, it was announced that Blom would no longer be a member of Team Pokerstars Pro.

In 2015 Isildur won $3.5 million on PokerStars’ cash tables, and lost $1.75 million on Full Tilt, putting him at +$1.75 million for the year.

The year 2016 was a year of struggle when Full Tilt closed, and Isildur was down by $735,000. However, he was then seen playing in the WCOOP, finishing third in Event 55 ($530 NLHE), winning $72,861.

His absence during several months at the biggest online tables has been widely commented by the community.

In 2017, during the SCOOP Festival on PokerStars, Isildur1 played most of the events of the series. In the Player of the Series Race (Overall leaderboard), Isildur1 accumulated 785 points, taking the runner-up spot, behind Naza114 from Portugal.

=== Tournament poker ===
WCOOP
Year	Tournament	Prize
2017	$2,100 HORSE Championship	$60,760

SCOOP
Year	Tournament	Prize
2012	$215 No Limit Hold'em	$247,200
2012	$530 No Limit Hold'em w/rebuys [6-max]	$160,000
2013	$10,300 NL Hold'em Main Event	$1,096,200

Year	Tournament	Prize
2012	PCA $100,000 Super High Roller	$1,254,400

Year	Tournament	Prize
2018	partypoker Millions Germany Main Event	€850,000

=== Live poker ===
Since signing with PokerStars in 2011, Viktor Blom has been paying more attention to live tournaments. His first notable live tournament cash was 16th place at the 2010 WSOPE Main Event for £33,582. In January 2012, at the PokerStars Caribbean Adventure, he won the first live tournament of his career, the $100,000 Super High Roller event for $1,254,400. In February 2018, Blom won the Partypoker Millions Main Event in Germany, for a cash prize of €850,000.

As of 2020, Blom's live tournament winnings exceed $2,900,000.

== Reaction ==
A number of Isildur1's regular opponents commented on him in the media buzz surrounding his collapse. On 11 December 2009, Ilari Sahamies appeared on the Finnish radio show Radio Rock Korporaatio, saying: “He’s been playing 9 tables at once against Patrik Antonius, Phil Ivey, and durrrr – the guy must be missing a chromosome.” Also that day, the Full Tilt Academy released a video in which Patrik Antonius discussed Isildur1 with Phil Gordon. Antonius, who won the largest online pot ever ($1.4 million) against Isildur1, called him “extremely dangerous” because he constantly puts his opponents to difficult decisions. Antonius further opined that the mysterious Swede would return.

The rise and fall of Isildur1 was on nearly every poker top-stories-of-2009 list, including those of Cardplayer, PokerNews.com, PokerNewsDaily.com, and pokerlistings.com.

On 22 December 2009, PokerNews.com published an interview with Isildur1 about his loss to Brian Hastings, but Isildur1 again refused to reveal his identity.
