= CardRunners =

Instructional poker website

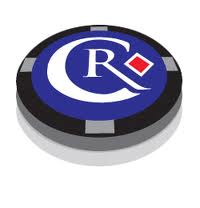
- Industry: Internet, Poker
- Founded: United States (January 2005)
- Founder: Taylor Caby; Andrew Wiggins
- Defunct: 2017
- Headquarters: Chicago, IL, United States
- Area served: Worldwide
- Products: Poker training videos, Poker coaching
- Website: www.cardrunners.com

CardRunners (also "Card Runners" and "Cardrunners") was an instructional poker site developed by Taylor Caby. CardRunners charged members a monthly fee for access to their catalog of poker instructional videos and private poker strategy forums. In 2007 the company took in more than $3,000,000 in revenue and as of 2008, CardRunners had over 10,000 subscribers.

CardRunners was founded in 2005 largely as a response to growth of interest in internet poker due to the Moneymaker Effect. Caby and Wiggins, two college friends and big winners on the Ultimate Bet poker site, would film their screen while playing online and narrate their thought process. They then sold access to those videos to subscribers.

In April 2008, Lee Jones left his position with the European Poker Tour (EPT) to join CardRunners as its Chief Operating Officer (COO). Prior to his work for the EPT Jones was the Poker Room Manager for PokerStars. Jones later left CardRunners to become the poker room manager for CakePoker.

In 2008, CardRunners merged with StoxPoker.com, founded by Nick 'Stoxtrader' Grudzien, to form Cardrunners/StoxPoker. In March 2010, Grudzien was forced out of the company after a multi-accounting and collusion scandal that broke on the 2+2 forums. The StoxPoker brand was subsequently put to rest, and the website was merged into CardRunners.com. Several instructors left to competing site DragTheBar.com

In 2008, CardRunners partnered with Full Tilt Poker and several members of 'Team CardRunners' became Full Tilt Poker 'Red Pro's' including Caby, Townsend, David Benefield, Brian Hastings and Cole South.

CardRunners went out of business in 2017.
