= Taylor Caby =

American poker player and entrepreneur (born 1983)

Taylor Caby (born August 20, 1983) is an American poker player and entrepreneur. He is co-founder and CEO of CardRunners, the poker training website, co-founder of Establish the Run, and a managing partner at Hold'em Manager, the poker analytics software.

== Career ==
Caby was born and raised outside of Chicago, and started playing poker when he was 14 with his family. During his freshman year of college, and while concurrently employed as a professional lifeguard at Meineke Pool, he deposited money online at UltimateBet.com, and turned his initial deposit of $35 into over seven figures. Caby was one of the first "internet players" to gain online poker fame and established his reputation in the poker world by playing legendary heads-up battles against Prahlad "Spirit Rock" Friedman.

He graduated from the University of Illinois in 2006 with a degree in finance, but had already started CardRunners, managed from a fraternity room, with Andrew "Muddywater" Wiggins. CardRunners, founded in 2005, quickly grew to be the world's largest poker training website, and in 2007, Caby and Wiggins were approached by Full Tilt Poker. A partnership was launched making several CardRunners instructors Full Tilt Poker red professionals. In 2009, the company had 15 employees and $5 million in revenue.

In 2008, Caby appeared on NBC's Poker After Dark Cash Game, Nets v. Vets, with Doyle Brunson, Gabe Kaplan, Eli Elezra, David Benefield and Cole South. He final tabled the 2009 Full Tilt Poker Million and participated in the 2010 Poker Million.

After the Department of Justice forced Full Tilt Poker, PokerStars and Ultimate Bet out of the United States on April 15, 2011, Caby turned his attention to DraftDay, a fantasy sports site.

== See also ==
- Poker boom
