= Brian Hastings (poker player) =

American poker player (born 1988)

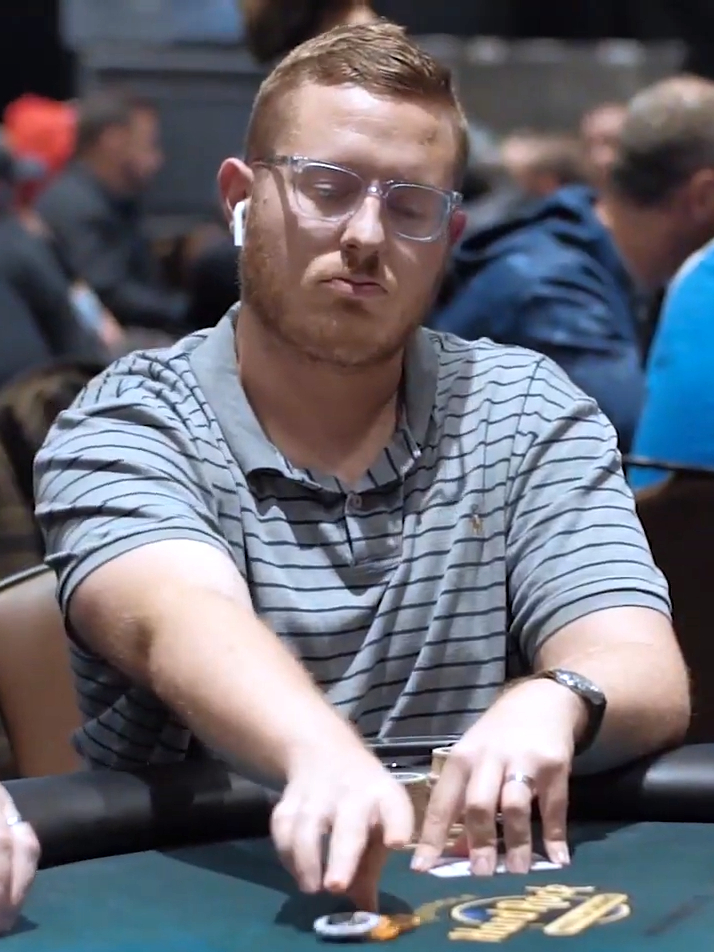
- Hastings in 2020
- Nicknames: Stinger88, NoelHayes, LucLongley
- Born: June 24, 1988 (age 38)

World Series of Poker
- Bracelets: 6
- Final tables: 16
- Money finishes: 55
- Highest WSOP Main Event finish: 49th, 2015

World Poker Tour
- Title: None
- Final table: 1
- Money finishes: 4

Brian Hastings (born June 24, 1988) of Hanover Township, Luzerne County, Pennsylvania is an American professional poker player known for his six World Series of Poker bracelets and for his profitable online cash game sessions against the Swedish poker player Viktor Blom, better known by his Online-Poker name Isildur1.

== Poker career ==
Hastings began playing online in 2006, inspired by his secondary school mathematics teacher. He entered Cornell University through the College of Engineering, and now majors in economics. He held a minority interest in Cardrunners.com. His style of play has been described on ESPN.com as one that places the game of poker in "a balanced place in a balanced life." The Hastings approach to the game is to draw on the strength of the collective; accent the importance of off-table work, and impart life balance to one's daily routine.

=== Contests ===
==== Vs. Isildur1 ====
In December 2009, Hastings played online Poker against Isildur1, winning $4.18 million in a single session, plus a further $1.5 million in a later session. The first, but not the second, of these sessions was controversial as Hastings is alleged to have shared hand histories with professional poker players Cole South and Brian Townsend, which would be a form of collusion and a direct violation of Full Tilt Poker's rules. Allegations of impropriety by Hastings' were cleared by Full Tilt Poker on December 21, 2009. Brian Hastings and Cole South were found to have not breached Full Tilt Poker's rules. The finding from the company was that “[i]t is fully acceptable for players to discuss strategy, and in this instance these players did discuss hands, an opponent and a strategy to play against this opponent. However, when the games are played there was only one player making decisions regarding the hand. Based on our findings, the sole breach of our site rules was by Brian Townsend who was found in violation of our rules regarding datamining. While he did violate our rules, he is receiving a punishment that is harsher than our standard response in these situations. We now consider this matter closed and all parties involved in the situation have been made aware of our decision.”

==== Vs. Ziigmund ====
On September 18, 2010, Hastings and Cole South went head to head with noted Finnish player Ilari Sahamies in a $500/$1000 Pot Limit Omaha game. Hastings had a longer run against Sahamies, playing 662 hands, losing $195,000 during the session. Cole South left the table at 300 hands, losing $621,000.

==== Poker After Dark ====
Hastings appears in Season 7, Week 5 of Poker After Dark. It is the first Pot Limit Omaha Cash session in the show's history. The group also includes Phil Ivey, Tom Dwan, Phil Galfond, and Patrik Antonius, whom Hastings regularly plays against online.

==== Live Play ====
With restrictions placed against online play in the United States, Hastings moved to live poker. In August 2011, Brian Hastings completed a transition to live tournament play by winning the $2,200 buy-in WPT Regional Summer Splash Event #12, earning $213,877 for his win. Nearly 400 people played in the tournament. Hastings outlasted Griffin Malatino in the Heads Up Play, Malantino taking home $117,300 as the second place player. HendonMob.com reported that Hastings had over $960,000 in live tournament earnings, and was considering relocating to Canada to return to online play.

=== World Series of Poker ===
Brian Hastings defeated Jason Mo in the final match of the $10,000 Heads-Up No-Limit Hold'em event at the 2012 World Series of Poker to win his first bracelet. He won his second bracelet in 2015 in the $10,000 Seven Card Stud Championship. Later that same World Series, he won his third bracelet in the $1,500 Ten-Game Mix Event. He won his fourth bracelet in a 2018 $3,000 H.O.R.S.E. event. In 2021, he won his fifth bracelet in the $10,000 Seven Card Stud Hi-Lo 8 or Better Championship event. In the 2022 WSOP, he won his sixth bracelet in the $10,000 Limit 2-7 Lowball Triple Draw Championship event.

World Series of Poker bracelets
Year	Tournament	Prize (US$)
2012	$10,000 Heads-Up No-Limit Hold'em	$371,498
2015	$10,000 Seven Card Stud Championship	$239,518
2015	$1,500 Ten-Game Mix	$133,403
2018	$3,000 H.O.R.S.E	$233,202
2021	$10,000 Seven Card Stud Hi-Lo 8 or Better Championship	$352,958
2022	$10,000 Limit 2-7 Lowball Triple Draw Championship	$292,146

== Associations ==
Hastings joined the Phi Kappa Psi fraternity at Cornell University, and through that organization, the Irving Literary Society.
