= Lee Jones (author) =

American online poker executive and author

- Education: Duke University; University of Maryland
- Occupations: Poker executive, author
- Website: Official website

Lee Jones is an online poker executive and the author of Winning Low-Limit Hold 'em.

== Education ==
Jones earned his B.S. in Computer Science from Duke University in North Carolina in 1978, and his M.S. in Electrical Engineering from the University of Maryland in 1983. In 2019, Lee partnered with Tommy Angelo to create the video series called PokerSimple.

He also contributes a monthly column to Bluff Magazine.

== Career ==
From October 2003 to April 2007, Jones worked as the cardroom manager of the PokerStars online poker cardroom. As the poker room manager, Jones decided which poker tournaments and games to offer the players. In April 2007, Jones left PokerStars and began work with the European Poker Tour. Jones said that he was making the change "to expand [his] horizons and stretch some new muscles." Jones organized, hosted, and provided television commentary for EPT events, while also still serving as a consultant for PokerStars.

In April 2008, Jones announced he was leaving EPT to become COO of CardRunners, a poker instructional website. He left CardRunners in 2009.

In May 2009, Jones signed on with Cake Poker Network's flagship member Cake Poker as the card room manager. He was also acting as a player advocate at Cake Poker. He resigned from Cake Poker in December 2010 citing "strategic decisions with which I'm not comfortable".

In 2012, Jones returned to work with PokerStars when they acquired FullTiltPoker.

In 2014, Jones earned 14th place in the Isle of Man stop of UKIPT (United Kingdom and Ireland Poker Tour)

== Heads-up poker system ==
In 2006, Jones and a former math lecturer named James Kittock (now at Google) developed a system for playing heads-up that they called the Sit and Go Endgame System (SAGE). This drew a mention in the New York Times poker column.
