= Bryan Townsend =

Bryan or Brian Townsend may refer to:

- Bryan Townsend (American politician) (born 1981), Delaware State Senator
- Bryan Townsend (Irish politician) (1660–1726), Irish politician
- Brian Townsend (poker player) (born 1982), American professional poker player
- Brian Townsend (American football) (born 1968), former American football player
