= Cole South =

American poker player (born 1987)

- Nickname: cts687
- Born: 1987 (age 38–39); Williamsburg, Virginia

World Series of Poker
- Bracelet: None
- Money finishes: 2
- Highest WSOP Main Event finish: 162nd, 2009

Cole T. South (born 1987) is an American professional poker player, author, and entrepreneur from Washington, DC. South is best known for his play online, though he has also made television appearances on Poker After Dark in season 5 of the show. South graduated from Georgetown University with a degree in economics in December 2011.

== Poker career ==
South started playing poker online in November 2005 at partypoker under the username CTS, depositing $50. He quickly improved as a player and through intensely studying the game he increased his bankroll to over $13,000 by October 2006. In just two years he went from playing small stakes poker, to building up a bankroll of over $2 million and playing in high-stakes online games, winning pots of over half a million dollars.

In April 2010, South left the team at the CardRunners website, which he was a partial owner of. During his time there he produced instructional poker videos where he shared his knowledge of the game. His mathematical approach to poker, as well as his pursuit of constant improvement and self-analysis are what makes Cole South stand out as a poker player: Poker is a game based on mathematics (probability and expectation in particular) and should be treated this way. Bets, folds, raises, bluffs, and all poker decisions should be evaluated solely on their expected value, not because a certain action "feels right" or "gives you information". As a mathematician this is perfectly clear to me, but it isn't evident to casual players and this is what makes poker profitable.

South experienced some large swings in February and March 2010, winning more than $3.5 million in the month of February, and losing $2.6 million in the month of March. Exactly one month after winning $1.1 million in a single day, South lost $1 million to Tom Dwan and Ilari Sahamies which is a clear example of his change in fortune at the online tables. Also in the month of March, South lost $785,000 in a single session over a span of almost 2,400 hands against poker player Isildur1. After starting at $100/$200 PLO they increased their bets to $300/$600 before their match had ended.

In December 2009, South was accused of sharing hand histories from his matches against Isildur1 with other professional poker players, Brian Townsend and Brian Hastings, with Hastings going on to win around 4 million from Isildur1. Ultimately it was determined that South did not share his hand histories or violate the Full Tilt Poker rules in any way and he was not penalized. Townsend was ultimately suspended from his 'Red Pro' status for 30 days for downloading hand histories from a widely used subscription service.

In March 2010, South entered a heated exchange with fellow professional poker player Ilari Sahamies (Ziigmund). The controversial Sahamies accused South of taking advantage of him being disconnected during an online match and continuing to make bets against him.

== World Series of Poker ==
Cole South has made an appearance in the World Series of Poker, he finished 162nd in the 2009 WSOP Main Event earning him $40,288. He cashed the following year as well, earning $36,463 for finishing in 365th.

== Entrepreneurial career ==
While he still plays poker, South has shifted his business focus to start-ups and entrepreneurial endeavors. He has invested and managed a variety of businesses including CardRunners, DraftDay, Expert Insight, Hold'em Manager, Terran Marketing, and a documentary on the online poker boom.
