= Hac Dang =

Vietnamese American poker player

- Nicknames: trex313 (Full Tilt Poker); 1Il|1Il|1il| (PokerStars)

World Series of Poker
- Bracelet: None
- Money finishes: 2
- Highest WSOP Main Event finish: 98, 2009

World Poker Tour
- Title: None
- Final table: None

European Poker Tour
- Title: None
- Final table: None

Hac Dang is a Vietnamese American professional poker player who specializes in online high-stakes cash games with a focus on pot-limit Omaha hold 'em. He has amassed over $8,500,000 in online poker cash games between his two accounts, "trex313" on Full Tilt Poker and "1Il|1Il|1il|" on PokerStars.

== Personal life ==
Hac is from Northern Virginia and began playing poker while attending the University of Virginia studying mechanical engineering. Hac quickly realized he could make more money in poker and switch to poker full time. He completed his degree even though he admits that he almost failed a course that he needed to graduate on time.

== Poker career ==
Hac specializes in online high-stakes and rarely plays live tournaments. He began playing with his brother Di Dang online combining their bankroll. After losing the first $200 they deposited another $200 and "never looked back". Since 2004, his has earned millions playing online. Prior to Black Friday Hac and his brother were among the biggest winners in online poker. Hac won over $6,500,000 playing on Full Tilt Poker and over $2,000,000 playing on PokerStars.

Both brothers were invited to join Phil Galfond's training website RunItOnce as poker coaches. After Black Friday Hac's brother retired from professional poker and opened a restaurant known as Chasin' Tails in Virginia. The restaurant opened in 2012 and currently has two locations one in Arlington, Virginia and the other in Centreville. The two brothers have been ranked as two of the top five players who quit while they were ahead.

Unlike Di who retired after Black Friday, Hac continued to play professionally until 2013. Between November 2012 and August 2013 he won $1.61 million. As of 2019, his account trex313 stands as the seventh biggest online high stakes cash game winner, his account 1Il|1Il|1il| is currently ranked at 32nd. Hac has cashed for over $50,000 in live poker tournaments.
