= Sam Farha =

Lebanese poker player (born 1959)

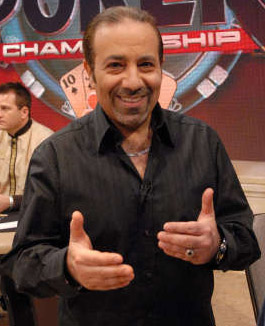
- Farha at the National Heads-Up Poker Championship
- Nicknames: Mister Cool; Sammy Farha
- Born: 23 February 1959 (age 67); Beirut, Lebanon

World Series of Poker
- Bracelets: 3
- Final tables: 6
- Money finishes: 9
- Highest WSOP Main Event finish: 2nd, 2003

World Poker Tour
- Money finishes: 3

Ihsan "Sam" Farha (Arabic: إحسان فرحة; born 23 February 1959 in Beirut, Lebanon) is a Lebanese professional poker player. He is best known for finishing as runner up in the World Series of Poker (WSOP) Main Event in 2003. He has won three bracelets at the WSOP in his career.

== Personal life ==
When the civil war erupted in Lebanon in 1975, the Farha family moved to the United States in search of a better life.

Farha went on to earn a degree in business administration from the University of Kansas. While completing his studies, he also learned to play pool, ping ball, and the video game Pac-Man so well that he earned substantial money by playing these games against others for cash.

After graduating from college, he moved to Houston, Texas. That is where he had his first encounter with poker, in the eighties. Shortly after, he made a trip to Las Vegas. His winnings at the poker tables made him realize he could make a living playing cards. Farha then decided to quit his job and moved to Vegas.

== World Series of Poker ==
Farha's biggest tournament finish was in the 2003 World Series of Poker Main Event, where he finished second to Chris Moneymaker for $1,300,000. On TV, Farha was identified as an "investor", a job Farha said he never actually held but was rather an identity he held to convince people to start a game with him. On the second day of play, Farha lost a major pot to Barry Greenstein leaving him with only 10% of the average stack. He was considering leaving at this point and was talked into staying in the tournament by Greenstein. He lost the final hand to Moneymaker when he went all-in with a pair of jacks on the flop, only to be called by Moneymaker who had flopped bottom two pair, which held after the final river card was dealt.

In a rematch between Farha and Moneymaker a few months later, organized by PokerStars, Farha won. They played against each other again in a special "grudge match" during 2011 World Series of Poker, which was won by Moneymaker in best-of-three format.

=== World Series of Poker bracelets ===
All of Farha's WSOP bracelets have come in Omaha events.

Year	Event	Prize Money
1996	$2,500 Pot Limit Omaha w/Rebuys	$145,000
2006	$5,000 Omaha Hi-Lo (8 or better)	$398,560
2010	$10,000 Omaha Hi-Low Split-8 or Better Championship	$488,241

== Other poker activities ==
- Farha has also finished in the money in the National Heads-Up Poker Championship, once for $75,000 and the other time for $125,000. He also has three cashes in World Poker Tour events, for a little over $100,000.
- Farha co-authored a book Farha on Omaha, a detailed guide on Omaha poker strategy. Farha intersperses basic strategies with his own personal strategies, so players can learn not only the game but also the style of Farha himself.
- Farha is a spokesman for Harrah's casino in Las Vegas.
- Farha has appeared on the GSN series High Stakes Poker, in seasons 1-4. Farha also made a cameo appearance in the 2007 film Lucky You.
- As of 2026, his total winnings exceed $2,900,000 in live tournament poker, although he tends to primarily play in high-stakes Omaha cash games. His eleven cashes at the WSOP account for $2,586,105 of those winnings.
