= Di Dang =

Vietnamese American poker player (born 1984)

- Nicknames: Urindanger ilvdnfl
- Born: 1984 (age 41–42)

World Series of Poker
- Bracelet: None
- Money finishes: 2
- Highest WSOP Main Event finish: 850, 2015

World Poker Tour
- Title: None
- Final table: None

European Poker Tour
- Title: None
- Final table: None

Di Dang (born 1984) is a Vietnamese American former professional poker player who specializes in online high-stakes cash games with a focus on pot-limit Omaha hold 'em. He has amassed over $8,000,000 in online poker cash games between his two accounts, "Urindanger" on Full Tilt Poker and "ilvdnfl" on PokerStars.

== Personal life ==
Di is from northern Virginia and began playing poker while attending the University of Virginia studying engineering. Di realized he could make more money in poker and switch to poker full time. He completed his degree in 5 years.

== Poker career ==
Di specializes in online high-stakes and rarely plays live tournaments. He began playing with his brother Hac Dang online combining their bankroll. After losing the first $200 they deposited another $200 and "never looked back". Since 2004, he has earned millions playing online. Prior to Black Friday Di Dang and his brother were among the biggest winners in online poker. Di won over $7,400,000 playing on Full Tilt Poker and over $650,000 playing on PokerStars.

Both brothers were invited to join Phil Galfond's training website RunItOnce as poker coaches. After Black Friday, Di retired from professional poker to start a restaurant known as Chasin' Tails in Virginia. The restaurant opened in 2012 and currently has two locations one in Arlington, Virginia and the other in Centreville. The two brothers have been ranked as two of the top five players who quit while they were ahead.

After retiring, Di has stated that he believes he got out of online poker at the right time due to a decrease in edge as a result of the shrinking skill gap. As of 2019, his account Urindanger stands as the fifth largest online high stakes cash game winner, Di has cashed for over $600,000 in live poker tournaments.
