= Cake Network =

Curaçao-based online poker network

- Type: Private
- Industry: Betting and gaming
- Founded: 2004
- Headquarters: Curaçao
- Website: CakePoker.eu

The Cake Network was a Curaçao based online poker network owned and operated by parent company Cake Gaming NV. Cake Network was founded in 2004 and launched its first network skin, Cake Poker, in June 2006. Other network partners followed, including Sportsbook.com, Red Star Poker and BetUS.

As of April 2010 the Cake Network saw a steep decline in player traffic as the company lost two major poker rooms, PlayersOnly and Sportsbook.com, to the Merge Gaming Network. Even with the addition of new rooms to the network, Cake continued to lose ground on the rest of the industry. In January 2011, Cake Network's well-known partner Doyles Room left the Cake Network, moving to the Yatahay Network.

Cake Poker offered a variety of stakes and types of online poker games including: Texas hold 'em, Omaha High / Hi-Lo and Telesina. At one time, Cake Poker was the only site of the 10 largest in the world which allowed players to regularly change their screen names.

Cake became notorious among both professional and amateur poker players for not paying cash out requests in good time as stated in its terms and conditions.

In June 2012 Lock Poker purchased the Cake Poker network, renaming it the Revolution Gaming Network

== Domain dispute ==
In September 2008, the Kentucky Governor Steve Beshear filed a civil suit asking a Franklin County Circuit Court to grant control of online poker website domain names to the government, including CakePoker.com.

In January 2009, the Kentucky Court of Appeals ruled that the seizure order issued by Judge Thomas Wingate should be set aside and made the decision to halt the forfeiture of the domain names.
