= Sportsbook.com =

Online gambling company

- Type: Private
- Industry: Betting and gambling
- Headquarters: USA
- Website: sportsbook.com

Sportsbook.com is a privately held online gambling firm, featuring sports betting, online poker, casino games and horse race betting that historically catered to the U.S. market.

Prior to the passage of the Unlawful Internet Gambling Enforcement Act of 2006, Sportsbook.com was owned by Sportingbet, whose sports betting network, also including AllStar.com and Hollywood Sportsbook, was named the "Best U.S. Sportsbook" in 2005 and 2006 by industry magazine eGaming Review. After passage of the Safe Port Act, Sportingbet sold all its U.S.-facing sportsbooks to a privately owned company, Jazette Enterprises Limited, for the nominal sum of $1, with Jazette also assuming approximately $13.2 million in liabilities.

Sportsbook.com's advertising included an "Everybody Bets" campaign featuring Brooke Burke and Nikki Cox in 2005 and 2006, respectively.

== Legal difficulties ==
On October 16, 2001, the New Jersey Attorney General initiated civil actions against several online gambling web sites, including Sportsbook.com. The New Jersey Director of Gaming Enforcement was quoted as saying "The citizens of New Jersey need to be aware that these sports betting operations are not regulated and are illegal. Regardless of their occasional claims of 'licensing' and 'legality,' they answer to no one and are therefore not held to the same scrutiny as our Atlantic City casinos." The case never went to court.
