= Eli Elezra =

Israeli poker player (born 1960)

Eli Elezra אלי אלעזרא
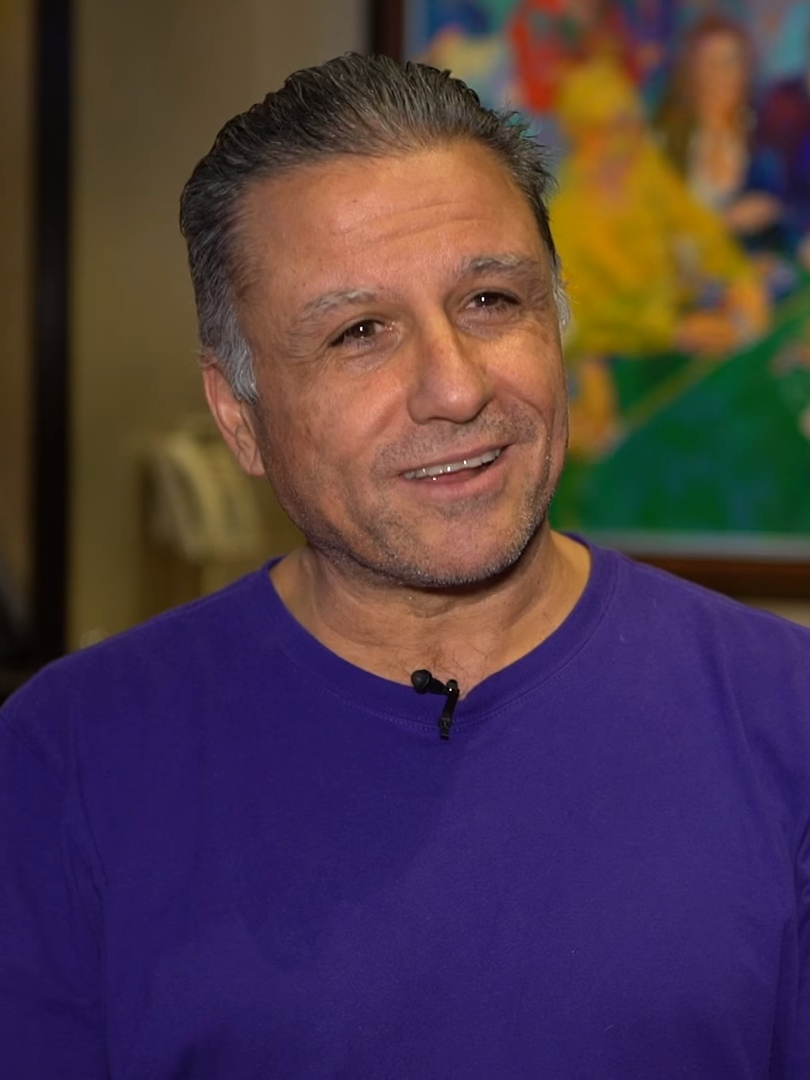
- Elezra in 2018
- Nicknames: Mr. Vegas, Wizard
- Born: 24 November 1960 (age 65)

World Series of Poker
- Bracelets: 5
- Final tables: 21
- Money finishes: 75
- Highest WSOP Main Event finish: 107th, 2011

World Poker Tour
- Title: 1
- Final table: 1
- Money finishes: 5

Eliahu Ilan Elezra (Hebrew: אלי אלעזרא; born 24 November 1960, in Jerusalem) is an Israeli professional poker player and businessman, now living in Las Vegas, Nevada. With five WSOP bracelets and a WPT win in the post Moneymaker era, he is one of the most successful players since the poker boom.

Since moving to America, Elezra has had more than 70 money finishes in the WSOP in Omaha, Texas Hold 'em and Draw events. In July 2004, Elezra won the WPT Mirage Poker Showdown, where he collected $1,024,574 for his efforts. Elezra has played in "The Big Game" in Vegas for many years. He appeared in the second and third season of the Poker Superstars Invitational Tournament. Elezra came known to the big public when he played in seasons 1–6 of the legendary GSN series High Stakes Poker and has appeared on several episodes of Poker After Dark. He also was a Full Tilt Pro.

Elezra won his first bracelet by winning the World Championship Seven Card Stud Hi-Low in the 2007 WSOP after defeating Scotty Nguyen heads-up. Before the event, Elezra had made a side bet with Barry Greenstein laying 10:1 odds that he would win a World Series bracelet in 2007. He bet $25,000 and collected $250,000, resulting in more money than the first place prize in the event that he won.

As of June 2026, his total live tournament winnings exceed $5.8 million. His cashes at the WSOP account for over $3,000,000 of those winnings.

Elezra released a biography about his life and career in poker in March 2017 entitled Poker Legend. The book was co-written by professional Israeli poker players Matan Krakow and Yoav Ronal. The book was translated into English by Robbie Strazynski and published by Two Plus Two Publishing under the title Pulling the Trigger in January 2019.

Elezra was inducted into the Poker Hall of Fame in 2021.

== World Series of Poker bracelets ==
Year	Tournament	Prize (US$)
2007	$3,000 World Championship Seven Card Stud Hi-Low	$198,984
2013	$2,500 2–7 Triple Draw Lowball (Limit)	$173,236
2015	$1,500 Seven Card Stud	$112,591
2019	$1,500 Seven Card Stud	$93,766
2022	$10,000 Pot-Limit Omaha Hi-Lo 8 or Better Championship	$611,362

== Personal life ==
Eli Elezra served in one of the Israeli Defense Force's Golani Brigades. During his time in the army, he served time in an Israeli prison for disobeying military orders.

He was discharged after he sustained a leg injury in the 1982 Lebanon War.

Later, he moved to the USA where he first began to work in the fish industry in Alaska, before making his way to Las Vegas to become the owner of a successful film-developing business in 1988. It was thanks to this venture that he started to enter the poker scene.
