= Brad Booth =

Canadian poker player (born 1976)

- Nickname: Yukon Brad
- Born: September 20, 1976 (age 50)

World Series of Poker
- Bracelet: None
- Money finishes: 2
- Highest WSOP Main Event finish: None

World Poker Tour
- Title: None
- Final table: 1
- Money finishes: 6

Brad Booth (born September 20, 1976) is a Canadian professional poker player, known for his appearances on the GSN series High Stakes Poker, where he bought in for a million dollars. Booth is also known for disappearing for about six weeks in 2020, later reporting he voluntarily dropped out of contact.

== Career ==
Booth developed an interest in cards as a child, playing solitaire-style five-card draw with a deck and chips given to him by his grandfather, a barber. As a teenager he hitchhiked to the nearest Canadian card rooms to play, and he later moved up from low-limit games in Canada to the highest-stakes cash games in Las Vegas.

Booth has said that he spread what he believes was the first low-stakes no-limit hold'em cash game in Las Vegas, a $1/$2 game at The Mirage, in 1998. He later played in "Bobby's Room" at the Bellagio against players including Doyle Brunson and Chip Reese. During the poker boom he lived in a Bellagio suite for about 18 months.

In the 13th episode of the 3rd season of High Stakes Poker, Booth stated that he has been playing poker every day for fourteen years – first in Vancouver, then Calgary, and then in the Yukon, hence his nickname "Yukon Brad". According to an interview on Mediocre Poker Radio, Booth was a victim of the Ultimate Bet cheating scandal, and may have been cheated out of $2 million. He continued to play poker online after being cheated, but without his former success. Since 2008, he has reportedly lost $4.2 million playing poker.

Booth appeared on the second season of NBC's Poker After Dark, on the episode "International Week," and finished in 2nd place to Patrik Antonius. Their heads-up clash was notable for the length of time it lasted, breaking previous Poker After Dark heads-up records. As of 2009, his total live-tournament winnings reportedly exceed $710,000.

In November 2009, Booth left Full Tilt Poker to become the spokesman and director of Poker Programming at the online gaming website Great Eight aka GR88.com.

In 2012, Booth publicly admitted that he'd failed to repay $28,000 he was loaned from fellow poker player Doug Polk, as well as various amounts loaned from other professional poker players.

== Personal life ==
On July 30, 2020, Booth was reported missing since July 13, after telling his roommate he was going camping. His roommate reported that Booth had only taken enough supplies "for a day or two".

On September 16, 2020, a message from Booth's family was posted on the Facebook page "Let's find Brad Booth," stating that they have "confirmation that Brad is alive and well" and that he "has been taking some time to himself." Additionally, they wrote that they "do not have any further information at this time." In a March 2025 interview on PokerNews' Life Outside Poker podcast, Booth said he had struggled with a gambling problem, exacerbated by alcohol, that began to take hold around 2012, and that his 2020 disappearance was a deliberate break during which he spent weeks in the woods. He said he had since moved to the Pacific Northwest and was playing low-stakes cash games in Oregon.

== Return to poker and debt repayment ==
In the March 2025 interview, Booth said he intended to repay debts owed to other poker players, including the money he borrowed from Doug Polk in 2012. According to a payment spreadsheet shared by Polk with PokerNews, the original $28,000 debt had been reduced to about $21,000, and Booth began making small recurring payments in January 2025 after about eight years without payments.

In July 2026, Booth entered the 2026 World Series of Poker Main Event on Day 2, his first Main Event appearance in more than a decade. He said he believed his last Main Event had been around 2012. He told PokerNews that he was continuing to make small payments toward past debts and that a deep run would help him do more.

== See also ==
- List of people who disappeared
