= BetUS =

Online gambling website

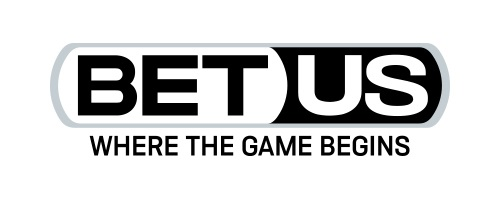
- BETUS
- Company type: Private
- Website type: Online gambling
- Available in: Multilingual
- Founded: 1994
- Headquarters: San Jose, {{{location_country}}}
- Area served: International (via Internet)
- Industry: Gambling
- Products: Bookmaker, online casino, financial betting
- Revenue: $150 M
- Website: Official website
- Current status: Open

BetUS is a privately held online gambling company offering sports betting, esports betting, casino games, and horse racing.

== Products ==
The company accepts bets on sports, e-sports and horse racing, casino such as poker tables, slots, blackjack, video poker, live dealers, and more. Games can be played as instant play using a web browser.

== Proposition wagers ==
BetUS offers so-called proposition wagers on current events, celebrities, reality TV and politics. It made headlines by offering odds on the effects of global warming and whether the world will end on 06/06/06.

== Services ==
BetUS operates through their website, which is a mobile platform for the site. On the mobile site, players can submit sports book wagers as well as access the BetUS mobile casino.

Live wagering is another service offered by the bookmaker, allowing players to bet on a sporting event as it occurs. Wagering is paused during critical moments and resumed when the action on the playing field is more neutral.

As of September 2024, BetUS is an 'A+'-rated sports book. Besides traditional banking methods like Visa, Mastercard, AMEX, bank wire, and bank transfer, the site also allows users to deposit and withdraw using certain cryptocurrencies, including Bitcoin, Bitcoin Cash, Litecoin, and Ethereum.

== BetUS TV ==
BetUS TV hosts a video platform with daily picks and predictions as well as sports analysis on all current leagues.

== BetUS Radio, Unfiltered podcast ==
The company once operated a radio station called BetUS Radio.

In October 2020 BetUS announced an agreement with the NFL Hall of Fame Super Bowl Champion Warren Sapp and NFL veteran and sports media personality Brian Jones to host BetUS Unfiltered. The show has received several guests such Adam Schefter, Derrick Johnson, Ray Lewis, Kenyon Rasheed, Rick Neuheisel, Kevin Carter, Dr. Jen Welter, Brendon Ayanbadejo, Tim Brown, among others.

== Controversies ==
In May 2025 the Michigan Gaming Control Board issued a cease-and-desist order alleging that BetUS offered online gambling to Michigan residents without a state license. In February 2025 the Florida Gaming Control Commission sent a similar letter directing BetUS to stop operating in the state.
