= Tom Dwan =

American poker player (born 1986)

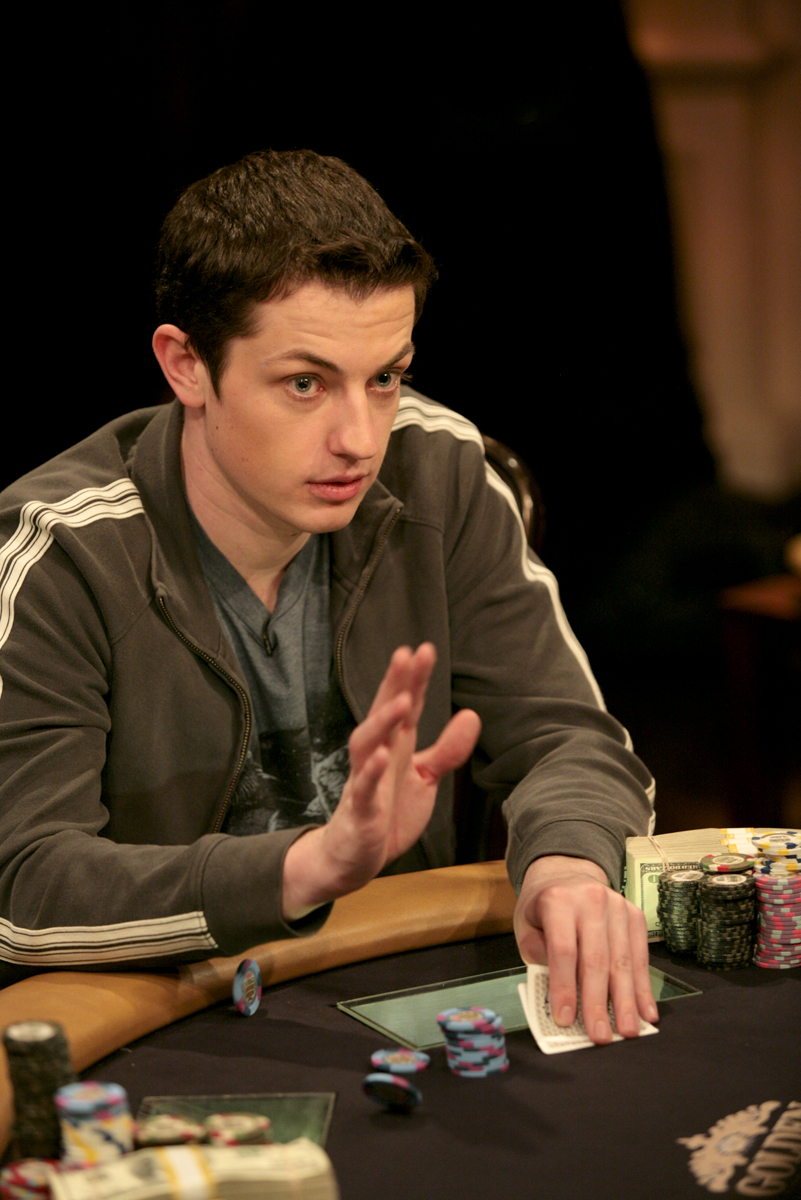
- Tom Dwan on High Stakes Poker in 2008
- Nickname: durrrr
- Born: July 30, 1986 (age 40); Edison, New Jersey, U.S.

World Series of Poker
- Bracelet: None
- Final tables: 3
- Money finishes: 11
- Highest WSOP Main Event finish: 593rd, 2024

World Poker Tour
- Title: None
- Final table: 1
- Money finishes: 2

European Poker Tour
- Title: None
- Final table: None
- Money finish: 1

Thomas Dwan Jr. (born July 30, 1986) is an American professional poker player who played online in the highest-stakes No-Limit Texas hold 'em and Pot-Limit Omaha games, primarily on Full Tilt Poker under the screen name "durrrr".

Dwan has won prize money in live poker tournaments and has appeared on NBC's National Heads-Up Poker Championship, the fourth, fifth, sixth, and seventh seasons of Poker After Dark, the third, fourth, and fifth seasons of Full Tilt Poker's Million Dollar Cash Game, and the fifth, sixth, eighth and ninth seasons of GSN's High Stakes Poker.

== Early life ==
Tom Dwan was born on July 30, 1986, in Edison, New Jersey. In season 5, week 7 of NBC's Poker After Dark, Dwan revealed that he worked for McDonald's prior to playing poker full-time.

He attended Boston University before dropping out after the first year to pursue playing poker full-time.

== Poker career ==
=== Online poker ===
Dwan began playing online poker with a $50 bankroll. He initially focused on sit-and-go tournaments, later switching to multiplayer cash games then to heads-up cash games.

According to HighStakesDB.com, a site that tracks high-stakes online poker, Dwan earned $312,800 in 2007 on Full Tilt Poker and $5.41 million in 2008. Before the 2007 World Series of Poker, Dwan claimed to have lost, at the time, $2 million of his $3 million bankroll, over a four-month period.

He recovered from this loss within a year. In January 2009, Dwan lost more than $3.5 million, which he recovered after six months.

From late October to late December 2009, Dwan suffered his then-largest downswing, losing approximately $2 million to Phil Ivey and Ilari "Ziigmund" Sahamies.

In late 2009, the online poker player known as "Isildur1" faced Tom Dwan in a series of high-stakes heads-up games, simultaneously playing on six tables with over a million dollars in play. Over the course of the sessions, Isildur1 won several million dollars from Dwan during one of the most notable periods of high-stakes online poker action. The player was later revealed to be the then-19-year-old Swedish professional Viktor Blom.

Dwan became involved in bringing this mysterious online-only player into public view, via Dwan's issuing an invitation to Blom to participate in the Full Tilt Poker Durrrr Million Dollar Challenge, live in London, on November 17–19, 2009; Finnish Ilari "Ziigmund" Sahamies, British Sammy "any two" George, and Italian Marcello "Luckexpress" Marigiano were already confirmed for the event.

At the end of 2009, HighStakesDB.com reported that Dwan had lost $4.35 million in 2009, which lowered his cumulative online poker winnings at Full Tilt since January 2007 at approximately $1.4 million.

HighStakesDB.com also reported that after stepping down in limits following his loss to Blom/Isildur1, Dwan won $2.7 million in December 2009.

Dwan had more than recouped his 2009 losses in the first few months of 2010; he was reported to have won $1.6 million in the first two weeks of April 2010, and after a session in which he won $1.6 million from Sahamies in a little over two hours, was ahead $7.3 million for the year as of April 21.

However, Dwan lost about $4 million in the next three weeks, leaving him ahead about $3.3 million for 2010.

==== Million-dollar challenge ====
In January 2009, Dwan issued a $1,000,000 challenge to play anyone online, "with the exception of Phil Galfond", heads up for 50,000 hands four-tabling at $200/$400 limits or higher No-Limit hold 'em or Pot-Limit Omaha. If his opponent is ahead after 50,000 hands, Dwan agreed to give them $1,500,000 more, while if Dwan is ahead, he will get $500,000.

Regarding his challengers, Dwan has said, "I think all of them actually are better over-all poker players than me – by quite a bit; I happen to think in this one area, I might have a little edge – and we'll see if I do."

Patrik Antonius and Daniel Cates were playing Dwan as part of the challenge, but neither challenge was completed. In October 2013, Cates was ahead about $1.2 million after roughly 20,000 hands.

Since then, however, Cates has publicly claimed that Dwan has stopped playing and is not responding to his queries. In August 2017, Cates stated that Dwan had paid him approximately $800,000 in penalties for not playing, that Dwan was committed to finishing the game, and they expected it to be completed by the end of 2018.

The Cates portion of the challenge remained unresolved for more than a decade, stalled by the shutdown of Full Tilt Poker and by Cates rarely playing online. In June 2025, Dwan and Cates released a joint video on the poker training platform GTO Wizard, formally announcing that the Durrrr Challenge had been resolved and that their business affairs were settled, though neither disclosed the specific terms.

=== Live tournaments ===
At the age of 19, Dwan cashed in at his first live tournament, finishing 12th in the £3,000 no limit Texas Hold 'em Main Event of the European Poker Tour's second season held in London, earning £7,000 ($12,398).

His next cash was not until he was 21 years old, at the World Poker Tour's 2007 World Poker Finals $9,700 No Limit Hold 'em Championship Event, where he finished 4th earning $324,244.

In January 2008, Dwan finished second at the Aussie Millions A$3,000 Pot Limit Omaha with Rebuys event, winning A$103,200 ($90,716), and later finished in 62nd place in the A$10,000 No Limit Hold 'em Main Event, good for A$25,000 ($21,976). Dwan finished second to James Michael Sowers at the 2008 WPT Borgata Winter Open in the preliminary $5,000 No Limit Hold 'em event, earning $226,100.

Dwan cashed twice in the first year that he could to play in a World Series of Poker (WSOP) event held in the United States. He reached the final table in the $10,000 World Championship Mixed Event at the 2008 World Series of Poker finishing in 8th place, earning $54,144. He nearly made another in a seven-person final table, but finished again in 8th, this time in the $5,000 No Limit 2–7 Draw with Rebuys event, earning $45,110.

Dwan participated in the 2008 NBC National Heads-Up Poker Championship held at Caesars Palace Las Vegas, where in his first match he defeated Phil Hellmuth in the third hand. Dwan was eliminated in the next round by Mike Matusow.

At the 2008 Five-Star World Poker Classic (the $25,500 WPT Championship), Dwan finished in ninth place, winning $184,670.

At the 2010 World Series of Poker in the $1,500 No Limit Hold 'em event, Dwan finished in second place for $381,885.

In 2011, Dwan cashed three times at the 2011 World Series of Poker, including a 5th-place finish in the $10,000 H.O.R.S.E. Championship for $134,480.

In 2016, Dwan went under the radar and was notably absent from that year's WSOP. It was rumored that he was traveling to Montenegro to play in Richard Yong's Casino. He was present in two events, however, including the Third Edition of the Triton Super High Roller Series in Manila, where he was seen in the company of Daniel Cates.

In 2017, Dwan appeared at the Macau Billionaire's Poker 2017 Spring Challenge set at the Babylon Casino in Macau. Running from March 17 to 20, the Super High Roller saw Dwan lose the final against Belarusian player Mikita Badziakouski. For his first live cash tournament since February 2014, Dwan pocketed the runner-up prize of US$275,000.

At the 2024 World Series of Poker, Dwan finished 593rd out of a record 10,112-entry field in the Main Event for US$32,500, his first WSOP cash since 2011.

As of August 2026, his total live tournament winnings exceed US$6.97 million across 56 recorded cashes.

=== Live cash-games ===
Dwan previously held the record for the largest pot won in a televised live game at over $1.1 million, which occurred during the fourth season of Full Tilt Poker's Million Dollar Cash Game. This record broke the previous record of over $919,000 also won by Dwan in the fifth season of High Stakes Poker.

He regained the record when he won a pot of $3.1 million during the Hustler Casino Live Million Dollar Game at the end of May 2023, with his pair of Queens beating Wesley Fei's Ace High.

As of 2016, Dwan has spent much of his time playing high stakes cash games in Macau and Manila.

More recently, he has mostly (though not completely) abandoned standard Texas hold 'em in favor of short-deck hold 'em. In a 2018 interview with Poker News, he said that he viewed poker as more of a game than a sport, and also tired of what he saw as the constant staredowns many players employed. While he admitted to having popularized staredowns, he objected to players doing so even when they were not in a crucial situation.

==== Full Tilt Poker Durrrr Million Dollar Challenge ====
Dwan's Million Dollar Challenge was expanded to a 500-hand live heads-up format in the Full Tilt Poker Durrrr Million Dollar Challenge. The event was held November 17 to 19, 2009, at Les Ambassadeurs Club in London and televised by Sky Sports.

The rules of the Challenge were that each player paid $250,000 for the privilege of playing, blinds were set at $500/$1,000 with each opponent having the choice of playing either Texas hold 'em or Pot Limit Omaha (PLO). Neither player could leave the match until at least 500 hands had been completed or one of them lost all of his buy-in and decided not to re-buy. Dwan's opponents were Marcello "luckexpress" Marigliano, Ilari "Ziigmund" Sahamies, and Sammy "Any Two" George, respectively.

The first match between Dwan and Marigliano consisted mainly of Texas hold 'em, although the players did agree to play Pot Limit Omaha near the end of the match. Dwan lost $22,500 which was highlighted by two bluffs by Marigliano.

In the second match between Dwan and Sahamies the players played only Pot Limit Omaha. Although the match started surprisingly slow considering the history of online competition between Dwan and Sahamies, the match eventually became aggressive as expected. There were several large pots resulting in large swings in both players' stacks. After 12 hours, the match concluded with Dwan winning $68,000.

The final round pitted Dwan against George in an exclusively Texas hold 'em match. During the match, the parties agreed to a 7–2 prop bet wherein if a player wins a pot with 7–2 then he earns an additional $10,000. This led to one of the most memorable bluffs in television poker history when Dwan bet $479,500 on the river, all in, into a pot of only $162,000. Dwan was bluffing with 7–2 against George's two pair (aces and sixes).

George folded his two pair after much consideration even though Dwan, after making a 6x pre-flop raise, had said he had 7–2 and just wanted the blinds. George went on to lose $750,000. Dwan made a final profit of $795,500 after winning two of the three matches.

=== Team Full Tilt ===
In November 2009, Dwan became a member of Team Full Tilt and re-signed as a brand ambassador for the site on October 15, 2012.

In December 2013, Full Tilt Poker confirmed that they and Dwan "agreed to part ways following the recent expiration of Dwan's contract".

=== Team ACR ===
In March 2024, Dwan signed as a brand ambassador for ACR Poker, joining Team ACR and playing on the site under the screen name "Durrr". This was his first major online sponsorship since Team Full Tilt disbanded following Full Tilt Poker's 2013 shutdown.

As part of the deal, Dwan hosts a recurring streamed cash game titled Durrrr's Game, featuring high-profile guests.

Dwan has also served as an ambassador for the Triton Poker Super High Roller Series since April 2019, and joined the poker training platform GTO Wizard as a Team Pro in 2025.

=== High Stakes Duel III ===
Tom Dwan challenged the undefeated Phil Hellmuth in round 2 of the High Stakes Duel III by Poker Go. Dwan ended Hellmuth's winning streak and took home $200,000.

The pair agreed to a third round at double the stakes to take place in Las Vegas during the 2021 World Series of Poker.

=== Style ===
In a YouTube video commenting on hands played by Dwan at the Hustler Casino in California in 2023, friend and fellow high-stakes poker player Phil Galfond described Tom Dwan as having the most thoughts per minute of any poker player he knows. Galfond mentioned that Dwan is factoring in bits and pieces of information at a speed and depth of thought that is "ridiculous".

=== Career earnings and debts ===
As of August 2026, Dwan's total live tournament earnings are approximately US$6.97 million.

Dwan has been embroiled in a long-running saga involving allegations of unpaid debts. Reports suggest that Dwan owes significant sums of money to various individuals, with some estimates placing his total debt at around $30 million.

This figure includes debts to poker players such as Daniel "Jungleman" Cates, Peter Jetten, and Haralabos Voulgaris, as well as rumored connections to high-stakes games in Macau and alleged dealings with the Chinese Triads.
