= Children Incorporated =

Non-profit organisation in the USA

Children Incorporated is a non-profit 501(c)(3) international child sponsorship and child assistance organization based in North Chesterfield, Virginia. Children Incorporated was founded in 1964 by Jeanne Clarke Wood. Children Incorporated relies on individual sponsors and donors to provide opportunities to children all around the world. Children Incorporated provides life-changing resources to children around the world because we passionately believe that every child deserves education, hope and opportunity.

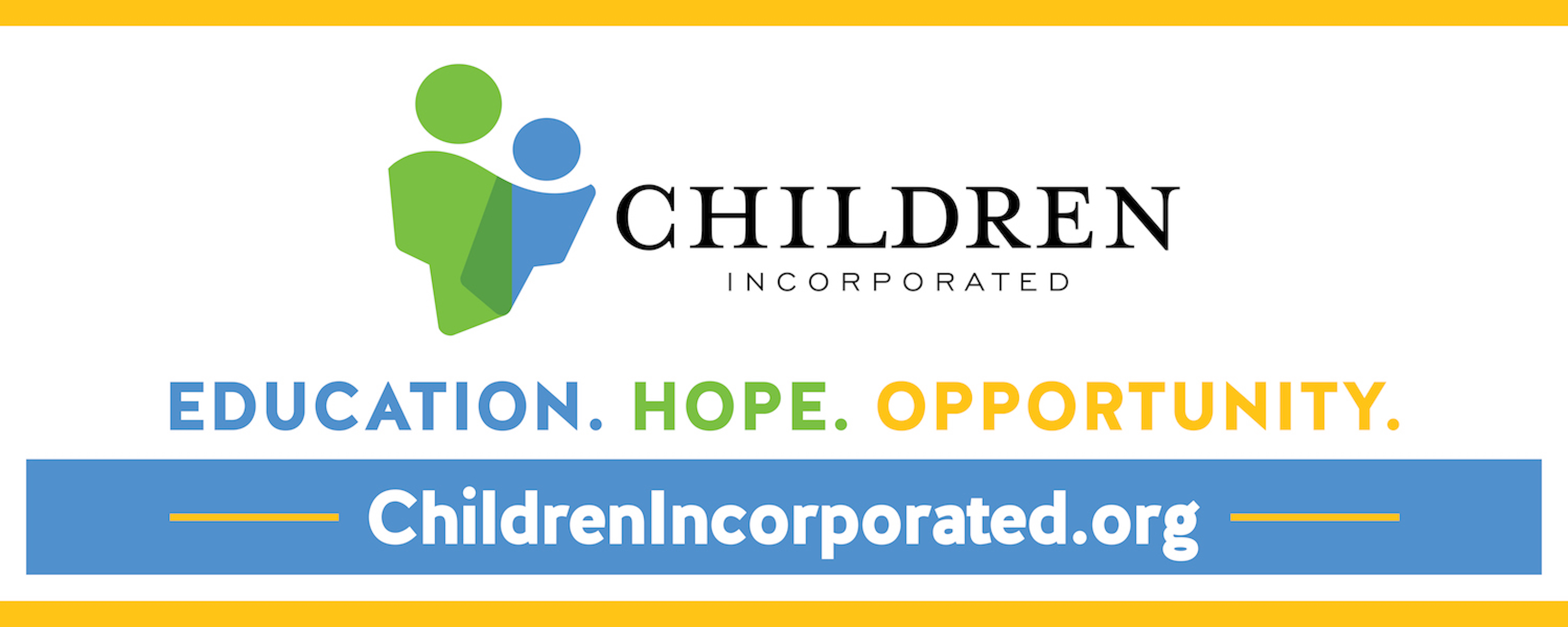

Children Incorporated is a top-rated international nonprofit organization that supports children and families who face challenges due to poverty. Through partnerships with 225 affiliated sites around the world, Children Incorporated provides basic needs to children so they can attend school, receive an education and have the opportunity to succeed.

Children Incorporated uses its network of volunteers to provide care to children enrolled in their program, as well as their partner schools, group homes, and community centres around the world.

Children Incorporated works in the United States and abroad. Internationally, Children Incorporated works in Mexico, Costa Rica, Nicaragua, Guatemala, El Salvador, Colombia, Chile, Honduras, Bolivia, Peru, Argentina, Paraguay, Brazil, Sri Lanka, India, The Philippines, Lebanon, Ethiopia and Kenya. The U.S. programs include three primary divisions: inner city, which includes Detroit, Michigan; Washington, D.C.; New Orleans, Louisiana; and Richmond, Virginia; American Indian, primarily in the Navajo reservation in Arizona and New Mexico; and Appalachian, primarily in Kentucky and West Virginia.

== Noted donors and recognition ==
Sponsored children in Africa receive food, clothing, school supplies, tuition, and health care thanks to support from Children Incorporated.

In 1997, Dr. Richard Carlson wrote about Children Incorporated in two of the books in his "Don’t Sweat the Small Stuff" series, in which he indicated that he and his wife and children were all donors, and tells of the positive experience of helping a child move forward in life. Carlson commented that, while many child sponsorship organizations are efficient and commendable, his personal favorite was Children Incorporated in Virginia. The two books, one of which was a New York Times Best Seller, resulted in over 11,000 individual child sponsorships through Children Incorporated.

One of Children Incorporated’s most well-known donors was poker professional Barry Greenstein. Greenstein chose Children Incorporated as the primary recipient of his poker winnings. Mr. Greenstein realized that there were nearly 300 unpaid volunteer coordinators managing the Children Incorporated programs in locations around the world. He wanted to do something to acknowledge these volunteers' valuable work with Children Incorporated. Thus, in 2008, he donated $1,000.00 to each coordinator, to be used in the centers as needed. Some coordinators kept a portion of the donation for their own use, but the majority put the money back into their programs for the benefit of the children they served.

In 2012, singer/songwriter Rosanne Cash headlined the Richmond Folk Festival to commemorate her 25 years of sponsorship with the organization and raise local awareness.

In 2014, Children Incorporated celebrated 50 years of helping children around the world, having helped over 300,000 children to receive an education.

In 2017, Children Incorporated partnered with Kristine Carlson, the wife of the late Dr. Richard Carlson, to promote the organization at the 20th Anniversary of "Don't Sweat the Small Stuff."

In 2017, Mary Wilson of the group The Supremes became a sponsor with Children Incorporated.

In 2017, OBEY Clothing partnered with Children Incorporated on a t-shirt designed by Artist Shepard Fairey to raise funds for the organization.

In 2022, Children Incorporated launched the Stories of Hope Blog Series, bringing stories of the impact of donors contributions to readers on a weekly basis.

In 2024, Children Incorporated celebrated 60 years as an organization.
