= Victor Ramdin =

Guyanese-American poker player (born 1968)

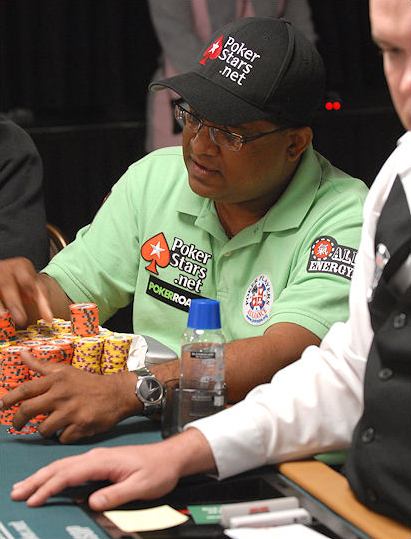
- Ramdin in the 2008 World Series of Poker
- Nicknames: Computer Man, Victor
- Born: May 28, 1968 (age 58)

World Series of Poker
- Bracelet: None
- Money finishes: 19
- Highest WSOP Main Event finish: 29th, 2003

World Poker Tour
- Title: 1
- Final tables: 2
- Money finishes: 21

European Poker Tour
- Title: None
- Final table: None
- Money finishes: 2

Annand Mahendra "Victor" Ramdin (born May 28, 1968 in Georgetown, Guyana) is a professional poker player with 19 money finishes and the winner of a World Poker Tour (WPT) Championship. He is based in The Bronx, New York and is a member of Team PokerStars.

== Poker career ==
Ramdin took up poker in 2002 after watching the game played in a bar and was later mentored by professional Phil Ivey. In 2003, one year later, he finished in the money of a World Series of Poker (WSOP) event for the first time in the $2,000 pot limit Texas hold 'em event. He also cashed in the $10,000 no limit hold 'em main event that year, finishing 29th. Later in the year, he finished 3rd at the Showdown at the Sands event won by John Myung. Ramdin finished highly in the main event of the 2004 United States Poker Championship. While he did not cash in during the main event of the following year's USPC, he did receive a signed copy of Barry Greenstein's book "Ace on the River" after eliminating Greenstein from this tournament. Ramdin also finished in the money of the World Poker Tour (WPT) season 3 championship.

In 2005, made the final table of the PartyPoker Million V Cruise. The following year, Ramdin won the WPT Foxwoods Poker Classic, when his A♥ J♠ defeated Alex Jacob's K♦ J♣ on a board of Q♥ 7♥ 3♠ 8♠ J♥ in the final hand. Ramdin took home $1,331,889 for the win. Two weeks later he came close to making the final table of the WPT season 4 championship, finishing 11th when his A♣ 10♣ failed to improve against Vanessa Rousso's A♠ Q♣ on the Q♥ 6♣ 4♣ Q♠ 8♠ board. Ramdin cashed four times at the 2008 World Series of Poker including one final table (7th $1,500 H.O.R.S.E event) and finishing in 64th place out of 6,844 entries in the $10,000 buy-in Main Event, earning $96,500. As of 2024, his total live tournament winnings exceed $5,200,000.

== Outside poker ==
Ramdin has philanthropic pursuits outside poker, and travels to Guyana with a team of doctors to do charity work. He also donated $100,000 to Guyanese First Lady Varshnie Jagdeo to take 13 children and four adults to Chennai, India for heart treatment. He also donates one-fourth of his earnings.
