= Phil Galfond =

American poker player (born 1985)

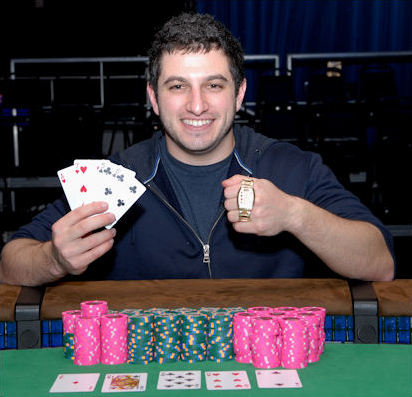
- Galfond, after winning the $5,000 Pot-Limit Omaha w/Rebuys event at the 2008 WSOP
- Nicknames: OMGClayAiken (Full Tilt); MrSweets28 (PokerStars); Jman28 (2+2)
- Born: January 16, 1985 (age 41)

World Series of Poker
- Bracelets: 3
- Final tables: 10
- Money finishes: 32
- Highest WSOP Main Event finish: 141st, 2010

World Poker Tour
- Money finishes: 2

Phil Galfond (born January 16, 1985) is an American professional poker player. Galfond won three World Series of Poker bracelets, in the $5,000 buy-in pot-limit Omaha with rebuys event in 2008, the $10,000 no-limit 2-7 single draw championship in 2015 and the $10,000 Pot Limit Omaha Hi-Lo 8 or Better Championship in 2018. Due to his success as a high-stakes online player, he appeared on multiple seasons of GSN's High Stakes Poker.

He is currently the owner of real money poker site Run It Once Poker and poker training site Run It Once Training where he also is a coach.

== Personal life ==
Galfond is originally from North Potomac, Maryland and attended Thomas Sprigg Wootton High School and the University of Wisconsin–Madison. He formerly resided in New York City, where he installed a slide as his access between the two penthouse apartments he purchased.

Galfond married actress Farah Fath on May 15, 2015. Their son, Spencer, was born in December 2018.

== Poker ==
=== Live poker ===
==== Tournaments ====
As of February 2020, Galfond's total live tournament winnings exceed $2,900,000. His 24 cashes at the WSOP account for $2,876,895 of those winnings.

===== World Series of Poker =====
Galfond won the $5,000 pot-limit Omaha with rebuys event at the 2008 World Series of Poker, earning $817,781. He defeated Adam Hourani during heads-up play. The final table featured a number of well-known professional players including Phil Hellmuth, Daniel Negreanu, John Juanda, Kirill Gerasimov, Johnny Chan, David Benyamine, Brian Rast as well as online star Adam 'houdini' Hourani. Galfond went on to win a second WSOP gold bracelet in 2015, topping a field of 77 entries in the $10,000 No-Limit 2-7 Single Draw Championship to win $224,383. He then earned his third gold bracelet in 2018, winning the $10,000 Pot Limit Omaha Hi-Lo 8 or Better Championship for $567,788.

World Series of Poker bracelets
Year	Event	Prize money
2008	$5,000 Pot-Limit Omaha w/ Rebuys	$817,781
2015	$10,000 No-Limit 2-7 Single Draw Championship	$224,383
2018	$10,000 Pot Limit Omaha Hi-Lo 8 or Better Championship	$567,788

===== World Poker Tour =====
Galfond has two World Poker Tour in-the-money finishes. He finished in 70th place in the $25,000 buy-in World Poker Tour World Championship in April 2008, earning $39,570. In December 2012, he finished 24th in the $10,000 buy-in WPT Five Diamond World Poker Classic for $31,714.

===== Other notable tournaments =====
Galfond finished in 18th place at the 2006 World Series of Poker Circuit event in Grand Casino Tunica, earning $22,895.

=== Online poker ===
Galfond is well known for online poker where he plays high-stakes cash games primarily $200/$400 stakes and above in no-limit Texas hold 'em and pot limit Omaha tables on Full Tilt Poker under his nickname "OMGClayAiken," and on Pokerstars under the screen name "MrSweets28." With a lifetime net profit of over $8M in Internet poker play, he has been one of the most successful online poker players in history (as of May 2011). According to Galfond, he chose “OMGClayAiken” as the antithesis of the “macho” screen names that are prevalent in online poker in hopes that other players would be embarrassed to lose to him.

Due to the legal actions against online poker, which are known as Black Friday, that took place on April 15, 2011, in the United States, Galfond moved to Vancouver, British Columbia, Canada so he could continue to play poker online.

In February 2013, Galfond's all-time online earnings on Full Tilt Poker came to over $10,000,000.

==== Galfond Challenge ====
In November 2019, Galfond issued a challenge to the poker world to play high-stakes heads-up pot-limit Omaha (PLO), deemed the Galfond Challenge. He issued the challenge in two parts: one challenge was open to PLO coaches and the other was to everyone else in the poker world. Several opponents stepped up and details were ironed out for a series of high-stakes poker matches that would be played on Galfond's online poker site, Run It Once Poker. The first six challengers were Bill Perkins, Brandon Adams, Chance Kornuth, Dan 'Jungleman' Cates, and online poker players 'ActionFreak' and 'VeniVidi1993.' In addition to the money won or lost on the poker table, Galfond and his challengers had large side bets that they were competing for.

After being down €900,000+ to poker professional VeniVidi1993, Galfond came back to win his first challenge by securing a €1,472 overall win and the side bet of €100,000.

In his match against Actionfreak, Phil Galfond ended the 15.000 hand battle with a €114,000 overall win. This win netted him the sidebet of €150,000.

=== Career earnings ===
As of August 2023, Galfond's total live tournament winnings were nearly $3,000,000.

== Business venture ==
In 2012, Galfond started the poker training site Run It Once Training with fellow high-stakes players, Ben Sulsky, Di Dang and Hac Dang as coaches. As of September 2019, 125 coaches had produced content for his training site.

Being concerned about the direction online poker was heading, Galfond announced the launch of poker site Run It Once Poker in August 2016. The site was launched in public beta in February 2019.

In October 2020, Run it Once was one of several entities named in a $330 million defamation lawsuit brought by poker professional Mike Postle.

In March 2022, Rush Street Interactive announced it had acquired Galfond's Run It Once poker brand and technology, in a deal which included Phil Galfond and his development team.
