= Barry Greenstein =

American poker player (born 1954)

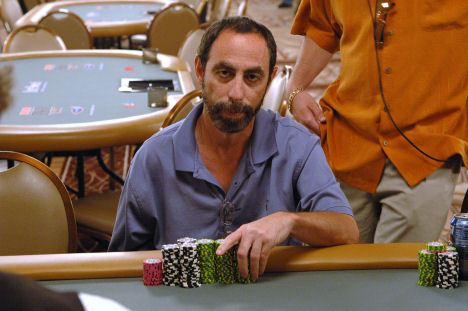
- Greenstein in the 2006 World Series of Poker
- Nicknames: The Robin Hood of Poker; The Cbettor from Chicago
- Born: December 30, 1954 (age 71); Chicago, Illinois, U.S.

World Series of Poker
- Bracelets: 3
- Final tables: 17
- Money finishes: 102
- Highest WSOP Main Event finish: 22nd, 1992

World Poker Tour
- Titles: 2
- Final tables: 5
- Money finishes: 19

European Poker Tour
- Title: None
- Final table: None
- Money finishes: 2

Barry Greenstein (born December 30, 1954, in Chicago, Illinois) is an American professional poker player and former mathematics postgraduate student. He has won a number of major events, including three at the World Series of Poker and two on the World Poker Tour. Greenstein donates part of his profit from tournament winnings to charities, primarily Children Incorporated, earning him the nickname "the Robin Hood of poker". He was elected into the Poker Hall of Fame in 2011.

== Personal life ==
After graduating from Bogan High School, he earned a bachelor's degree in computer science from the University of Illinois at Urbana-Champaign. He studied for a PhD in mathematics without ever defending his completed dissertation.

According to his book, Ace on the River, Greenstein was doing well playing poker, but figured a more conventional job would improve his chances of adopting his stepchildren, so he went to work for the new startup company Symantec, where he worked on their first product Q&A. He left the company in 1991 at age 36.

Greenstein has two children and four stepchildren, and he resides in Rancho Palos Verdes, California. His stepson, Joe Sebok, with whom he started PokerRoad—a poker strategy and entertainment website—also played professionally for a few years.

== Poker career ==
Greenstein has appeared in each of the first three series of Poker Superstars Invitational Tournament and all seven seasons of the GSN series High Stakes Poker. He has also appeared in the first three seasons of the late night series Poker After Dark on NBC. Greenstein has also won two World Poker Tour (WPT) titles: the Fifth Annual Jack Binion World Poker Open ($1,278,370), and 2006 WPT Invitational at the Commerce Casino ($100,000). He has also won two other WPT titles in special events: WPT Father and Sons Tournament, 2006 World Poker Finals; and WPT Poker by the Book: Chapter 2. As of 2008, he began donating his net winnings to charity. At the 2008 World Series of Poker (WSOP), Greenstein cashed in six events, including the H.O.R.S.E. $50,000 event, for a total of $768,461. He also finished second in the 2008 WSOP Player of the Year standings, behind Erick Lindgren. In 2011, Greenstein cashed five times at the World Series of Poker, including a 3rd place in the $10,000 Limit Hold'em Championship for $169,512 and a 15th place in the $50,000 Player's Championship.

In 2005, Greenstein wrote a book titled Ace on the River. Tuan Le, a WPT Season 3 champion, claims that book showed him how to succeed on the poker circuit. Greenstein is known for giving away a free copy of his book to the player who eliminates him in a tournament, including his autograph and details of the hand. Greenstein taught former girlfriend Mimi Tran how to play poker in exchange for her teaching him how to speak Vietnamese. He also played online at PokerStars, under the alias "barryg1" and was a member of the cardroom's Team PokerStars.

He accepted a bet of $10,000 from 2+2 Poker Forums to say "lol donkaments" on an episode of High Stakes Poker, which he did after winning a hand against professional poker player Erick Lindgren. After the initial $10,000, he also received a further $45,000 in donations from other charitable poker players who were amused by the bet.

=== World Series of Poker bracelets ===
Year	Tournament	Prize (US$)
2004	$5,000 No Limit Deuce to Seven Draw	$296,200
2005	$1,500 Pot Limit Omaha	$128,505
2008	$1,500 Razz	$157,619

As of 2023, his total live tournament winnings exceed $8,500,000. His 102 WSOP cashes account for $3,148,034 of those winnings.

== Philanthropy ==
Greenstein often uses his poker winnings to further his philanthropic and charitable interests, earning him the "Robin Hood of Poker" nickname. After winning $770,000 at Larry Flynt's $1 million Seven-Card Stud event in 2003, he donated $440,000 to Children Incorporated – a gift of $1,000 to each of the charity's 440 employees. In 2006, Greenstein announced that he would be donating net earnings from tournaments to charity. "Until now, I was donating the pay-off each time I cashed but I can't afford to continue doing that. I didn't anticipate the growth and expense of tournament poker," he said.

== Bibliography ==
- Ace on the River: An Advanced Poker Guide. Last Knight Pub. 2005. ISBN 0-9720442-2-1.
