= Andrew Robl =

American poker player (born 1986)

- Born: September 27, 1986 (age 40); Okemos, Michigan

World Series of Poker
- Bracelet: None
- Final table: 1
- Money finishes: 9

World Poker Tour
- Title: None
- Final table: 1
- Money finishes: 8

European Poker Tour
- Title: None
- Final table: 1
- Money finish: 1

Andrew Robl (born September 27, 1986), is an American professional poker player from Okemos, Michigan.

As a teenager, Robl discovered poker by watching ESPN’s coverage of the World Series of Poker. He started playing the game with his friends, and in online cash games, despite being underage at the time. During the summer between his senior year in high school and freshman year in college, he made between $70,000 and $80,000 playing online poker. At the age of 21, he moved to Las Vegas to pursue a career in poker.

In 2008, Robl appeared on season 4 on the poker television show Poker After Dark on NBC. He was on the Nets vs Vets episode. In 2013, he won the Aussie Millions $100,000 Challenge for $1,055,699. He lost a televised 532,000 chip pot to Toby Lewis after his quad nines lost to quad queens during the PartyPoker.com World Open VI tournament.

As of 2021, Robl's total live tournament winnings exceed $5,800,000. That sum was accumulated by cashing in 35 different events over the course of 12 years.
