= Brandon Adams (poker player) =

American poker player and author (born 1978)

George Brandon Adams
- Born: December 12, 1978 (age 47)
- Education: University of Florida (MA, BA); Harvard Business School (PhD)
- Occupations: University lecturer; Author; Poker player
- Organization(s): Dungeons & Dragoons
- Title: Doctor of Economics
World Series of Poker
- Bracelet: 1
- Final tables: 4
- Money finishes: 20
- Highest WSOP Main Event finish: 69th, 2007
World Poker Tour
- Title: None
- Final table: 1
- Money finish: 1

George Brandon Adams (born December 12, 1978) is an American poker player and self-published author.

== Career ==
Adams got his bachelor's degree and Master's degree at the University of Florida, before attending Harvard Business School and obtaining a doctorate.

Adams finished a book titled "Setting Sun: The End of Economic Dominance". He previously published a poker novel, "Broke: A Poker Novel" in 2008. He co-authored a book on behavioral finance, "The Story of Behavioral Finance", with Brian Finn.

== Poker ==
Brandon Adams was first introduced to poker during his college years.

Adams first cashed in the World Series of Poker in 2006 in the $1,000 No Limit Hold'em event and again in the Main Event the following year, winning a cash prize of $130,288 for his 69th-place finish.

His best finish in a tournament at the WSOP came in 2019 when he won the $3,200 Online No-Limit Hold'em High Roller (Event #74) event for $411,561. In total, Adams has cashed twenty-three WSOP events and has made seven WSOP and WSOP Circuit final tables as of the end of the 2019 series.

Adams played on Season 4,8, and 12 of High Stakes Poker, and on Season 4, 6, 7, 8, and 9 of Poker After Dark.

Adams has appeared on over sixty poker TV shows on NBC, ESPN, and ESPN2, Game Show Network, and PokerGO. He has appeared on High Stakes Poker, Poker After Dark, Super High Roller Club, Super High Roller Cash Game, and also on live tournament coverage on PokerGO including Super High Roller Bowl, Poker Masters, and U.S. Poker Open.

As of March 2025, his total live tournament winnings exceed $5,400,000. His 31 WSOP cashes account for $2,728,354 of that total.

== Business career ==
In 2011, Adams founded Expert Insight at a cost of $450,000. The website allowed its customers 1-on-1 video chat sessions with experts in various fields, such as a chat with Nobel Prize winner Gary Becker, for $5,000 an hour.
