= Dario Minieri =

Italian poker player (born 1985)

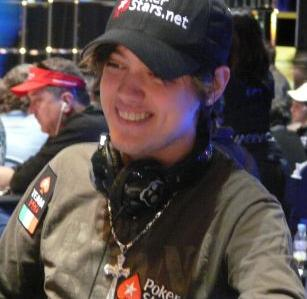
- Minieri at the EPT Grand Final Monaco 2009
- Nickname: Supernova

World Series of Poker
- Bracelet: 1
- Money finishes: 8
- Highest WSOP Main Event finish: 96th, 2007

World Poker Tour
- Title: None
- Final table: 1
- Money finishes: 2

European Poker Tour
- Title: None
- Final tables: 3
- Money finishes: 6

Dario Minieri (Italian pronunciation: [ˈdaːrjo miˈnjɛːri]; born 1985) is an Italian professional poker player from Rome, Italy, who won a bracelet at the 2008 World Series of Poker at the age of 23, is a member of team PokerStars, is an online poker player who was the first person to collect enough Frequent Player Points to buy an automobile with them, and is a three-time European Poker Tour final tablist.

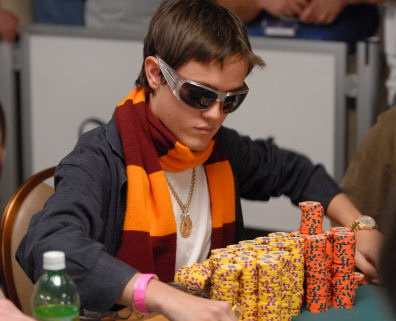
Minieri as chip leader at the 2007 World Series of Poker.

== Online poker ==
Minieri plays on PokerStars under his own name "D.Minieri". He became the first person to buy a car, a 2007 Porsche Cayman S, with 3 million frequent player points.

On 27 January 2008, Minieri won PokerStars $5,200 (winner-takes-all) Freezeout, a 20 player tournament in which the winner takes the $100,000 prize barring any deals. When the game was left with two players, known as heads-up play, Minieri and his opponent Isaac Baron requested that the game pause to look over a deal; the deal was offered based on their chip equity with $25,000 by rule set aside for the winner. Baron, who was down to a 3-1 chip deficit demanded a larger portion of the chop with the majority going to Minieri. Minieri refused the deal and went on to win the entire $100,000.

== World Series of Poker ==
Minieri has cashed eight times at the World Series of Poker (WSOP). At the 2007 World Series of Poker Main Event, Minieri, who once was the chip leader coming off of day 3, finished in 96th place out of a field of 6,358 entries.

The next year, Minieri won his first bracelet at the 2008 World Series of Poker in the $2,500 No-Limit Hold'em Six-handed event, beating out a field of 1,012 players, earning $528,418 his highest cash to date. In the final hand, with blinds 30,000/60,000 with a 5000 Ante, Minieri made a raise preflop to 125,000. His opponent Seth Fischer re-raised all-in and was called by Minieri's Q♠ Q♦ to Fischer's K♦ 10♦ on a board of A♥ A♦ 5♣ 2♣ 3♦.

=== World Series of Poker bracelets ===
| Year | Event | Prize Money |
|---|---|---|
| 2008 | $2,500 No-Limit Hold'em Six-handed | $528,418 |

== European Poker Tour ==
At the European Poker Tour (EPT) in Baden, Austria (The Big Double 2006), Minieri finished 3rd in the €5,000 No Limit Hold'em event, earning €125,780 ($159,763).

At the EPT of Sanremo, Italy on 5 April 2008, Minieri held the chip lead at the beginning of the final table and finished in 3rd place for €287,600 ($454,366). In his final hand, Minieri was dealt Q♠ Q♦. Minieri raised to 100,000 and Jason Mercier of the United States re-raised to 340,000 with A♦ 4♦, and Minieri called. After the flop came down 7♥ 2♦ 8♦, Mercier checked, and Minieri bet 400,000. Mercier then check-raised all-in with his nut flush draw. Minieri quickly called while ahead in the hand, putting his tournament life at risk with the two queens. The turn was the 4♥, giving Mercier even more outs and the 3♦ on the river made Mercier the winning flush to eliminate Minieri. Mercier went on to win the event.

In 2008, Minieri made a second EPT final table at the event in Warsaw and again finished in 3rd place, earning €123,162 ($153,619).

As of 2026, his live tournament winnings exceed $1,900,000. His cashes as the WSOP account for $755,097 of those winnings. He currently ranks 21st among Italian poker players in all time live tournament earnings.
