= Brian Townsend (poker player) =

American poker player (born 1982)

- Nicknames: sbrugby, aba20, "Btown"
- Born: 1982 (age 43–44)

World Series of Poker
- Money finishes: 3
- Highest WSOP Main Event finish: 170th, 2014

World Poker Tour
- Title: None
- Final table: None
- Money finish: 1

Brian Townsend (born 1982) is an American professional poker player. He graduated from the UC Santa Barbara and played Lock for UCSB's 2005 league championship rugby team.

== Biography ==
Townsend is largely known for his success playing no limit hold 'em and pot-limit omaha at Full Tilt Poker, playing under the nickname 'sbrugby.'

Townsend began playing online poker at $0.50/$1.00 blinds but gradually moved up in stakes, eventually becoming a regular player in some of the highest stakes games online. By the mid to late 2000s, Townsend was among the most highly respected professional online poker players in the world. Townsend appeared on season 3 of GSN's High Stakes Poker. He also appeared on NBC's Poker After Dark and won $120,000 by beating Doyle Brunson heads up. After considerable success in playing high-stakes games, he was featured on the front cover of the August/September 2007 issue of Cardplayer Magazine and November 2008 issue of Inside Poker.

Although better known to be a heads up and short handed specialist online, Townsend has participated in several live tournaments, including an in the money finish at a World Poker Tour no limit hold 'em event, and a 10th-place finish at a World Series of Poker circuit event. In 2014, Brian Townsend played at the World Series of Poker (for the first time since 2011) and finished 170th out of 6,683 players for a $44,728 payday.

In December 2009, Townsend was accused of sharing hand histories with professional poker players, Cole South and Brian Hastings.

Since Black Friday Brian has spent less time playing live tournaments, and more time playing online. He prefers playing online poker, over the limelight of live tournaments. He regularly participates in road running races and triathlons.

As of 2017, Townsend's total live tournament winnings exceed $460,000.
