= Erick Lindgren =

American poker player (born 1976)

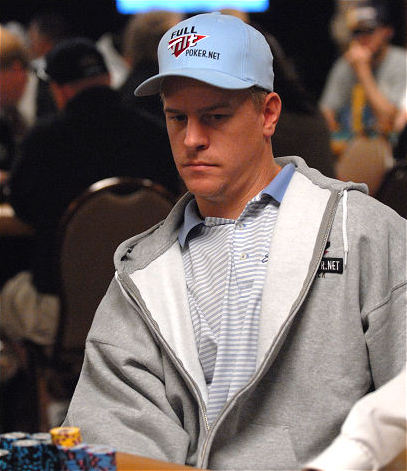
- Lindgren at the WPT's Doyle Brunson Five Diamond World Poker Classic in 2007
- Nickname: E-Dog
- Born: August 11, 1976 (age 50)

World Series of Poker
- Bracelets: 2
- Money finishes: 40
- Highest WSOP Main Event finish: 43rd, 2011

World Poker Tour
- Titles: 2
- Final tables: 5
- Money finishes: 16

Erick Lindgren (born August 11, 1976, in Burney, California) is an American professional poker player. He has won two World Poker Tour (WPT) titles, two World Series of Poker bracelets, and more than $10,500,000 in tournament earnings during his poker career. As of April 2020, he is 85th on the all-time money list of poker.

== Poker career ==
Lindgren won his first major tournament at the Bellagio in 2002 and followed that up with his first World Poker Tour (WPT) win ten months later. Six months later, he won the WPT PartyPoker Million III cruise, where he walked away with the million dollar top prize.

In January 2005, he finished runner-up in the World Series of Poker Circuit Event in Atlantic City. In February, he finished fifth in the WPT LA Poker Classic and just a week later, he won the second Professional Poker Tour tournament, also in LA.

In January 2006, he made another WPT final table, finishing third at the 2006 Borgata Winter Poker Open.

In June 2006, Lindgren won the $600,000 first prize in the FullTiltPoker.net Poker Pro Showdown event, outlasting Mike Matusow, Clonie Gowen, Erik Seidel, John Juanda, Chris Ferguson, and Phil Ivey. Lindgren's winning hand came in the first hand of heads-up play when his A♣ K♣ defeated Matusow's A♥ J♣ on a board of 6♠ 6♣ 9♦ A♠ 3♠.

In January 2007, Lindgren won A$1 million after beating 17 other players in the $100,000 buy-in Hold'em event at the Aussie Millions.

Lindgren is the author of the book, World Poker Tour: Making the Final Table, which covers strategy for poker tournaments.

Both the first name 'Erick' and the family name 'Lindgren' are Swedish names, representative of his Swedish ancestry.

He is a former member of "Team Full Tilt" at Full Tilt Poker. In February 2008, Lindgren hosted "FTOPS Event #9", part of Full Tilt's series of large buy-in tournaments. The tournament had over 5,600 entrants, and had a prize pool of over $1.65 million. Lindgren won the tournament becoming the first Full Tilt pro to win an FTOPS event that they hosted. He took home over $291,000.

On June 27, 2007, Lindgren won a $350,000 prop bet with Gavin Smith, Phil Ivey and others. To win the bet, Erick had to play four consecutive rounds of golf at Las Vegas' "Bear's Best" golf course between sunrise and sunset. He had to carry his own bags and shoot under 100 in each of the four rounds. Temperatures reached 106 degrees and symptoms of heat exhaustion set in, but Erick won the bet. He said on a PokerListings interview that he lost 12 pounds during the bet.

On June 5, 2008, Lindgren defeated Justin Bonomo during heads-up play for his first World Series of Poker bracelet in the $5,000 buy-in mixed no-limit/limit Hold'em event at the 2008 World Series of Poker. In May 2013, Erick finished second in the WPT championship for $700,000. In the 2013 WSOP, he won his second bracelet in the $5,000 No Limit Hold'em - 6 Handed Event for $606,317.

As of 2024, his total live tournament winnings exceed $10,800,000. His 54 cashes at the WSOP account for $4,043,085 of those winnings.

=== World Series of Poker bracelets ===
| Year | Tournament | Prize (US$) |
|---|---|---|
| 2008 | $5,000 Mixed Hold'em (Limit/No-Limit) | $374,505 |
| 2013 | $5,000 No-Limit Hold'em Six Handed | $606,317 |

In 2008, he was named WSOP Player of the Year. With five total cashes, he earned $1,348,528 in prize money.

== Personal life ==
On May 29, 2011, Erick married fellow poker player Erica Schoenberg. They have one child but are divorced since 2014.

== Gambling debts and rehab ==
As a sponsored professional, Lindgren had been receiving a monthly paycheck from Full Tilt Poker, but he lost that income when Black Friday struck on April 15, 2011. An avid sports bettor, he was saddled with sizable gambling debts he could not repay. In late November 2012, Lindgren entered a rehab program for problem gambling. According to an interview he gave with Bluff Magazine in January 2013, he had come to a payment schedule agreement with those to whom he owed money. In the Lederer Files, Howard Lederer states that Erick Lindgren was given several million-dollar loans as a member of Full Tilt Poker. Lindgren then refused to answer texts and phone calls by Lederer requesting repayment. Lindgren never paid back millions to Full Tilt Poker. In June 2015, Lindgren refiled for Chapter 11 bankruptcy protection in a District of Nevada United States Bankruptcy Court, citing a cumulative debt load of more than ten million dollars and available assets of less than $50,000.

== Bibliography ==
- World Poker Tour: Making the Final Table (2005) ISBN 0-06-076306-X
