= Ilari Sahamies =

Finnish poker player (born 1983)

- Nicknames: Ziigmund (Full Tilt Poker); Ilari FIN (PokerStars)
- Born: 2 February 1983 (age 43); Helsinki, Finland

European Poker Tour
- Final tables: 3
- Money finishes: 4

Ilari Sahamies (born 2 February 1983) is a Finnish professional poker player, also known by the online poker name Ziigmund. He specializes in high-stakes pot-limit Omaha cash games. Sahamies is known for his trashtalk at the poker table, usually aimed towards his fellow pros, which has led to an online following. Sahamies played poker live in Finland before transitioning to online poker, where he now makes most of his money. Ilari has appeared on television shows including High Stakes Poker and Poker After Dark.

Sahamies first played poker at the age of 15, when he participated in a home game at fellow Finnish poker pro Patrik Antonius' home. They first met at a local billiard hall, where Sahamies spent a lot of his time. He earned two Finnish junior championships for billiards; Sahamies is also the defending Finnish watersliding champion as of 2009. When he was 18, Sahamies made his first visit to the Grand Casino Helsinki, eventually becoming a professional poker player in two years. Sahamies, who enjoys drinking alcohol, used to occasionally play online poker while intoxicated, a habit which lost him more than US$3 million over four years, and $700,000 in a single day. Ilari co-founded the online poker hub Coinflip.com with fellow Finnish poker pro Sami Kelopuro. He is sponsored by the online poker site PowerPoker.com. Sahamies, known to be a fan of Finnish hip hop music, starred in a rap music video "Pojat on poikii", which was sponsored by PowerPoker.

Sahamies earned a total of $2,120,703 in live tournament winnings as of January 2026, ranking him 14th on Finland's all-time money list. As of November 2012, his total tracked online cash game profits on Full Tilt Poker and PokerStars amount to $3,734,605.

In 2014, Sahamies paid 50 000 euros to become part of the Finnish hip hop band Teflon Brothers when they were looking for a new member through an online bidding. He appears as a featured guest on the group's 2015 song "Pämppää".
