= Poker on television =

Poker television programs had been extremely popular, especially in North America and Europe, following the poker boom. This has especially become the case since the invention of the "pocket cam" in 1997 (and its first use in the United States in 2002), which allows viewers at home to see each player's hole cards. However, viewership has been declining dramatically in recent years, due to laws that restricted online play in the United States.

== History ==
Poker has been appearing on television somewhat regularly since the late-1970s. In the United States, CBS started airing the final table of the World Series of Poker (WSOP) Main Event as an annual one-hour show around this time and later by ESPN, which were casino-produced shows produced under a time-buy arrangement for sports omnibus programming such as the CBS Sports Spectacular. For many years, the coverage was less than robust because viewers at home could not see what cards the players had or follow their progress visually through graphics. Instead, the coverage essentially involved the commentators guessing what cards the players had in a documentary style production.

In 1997, the hole cam, which allows audiences to see the hidden cards that players held in their hands, was introduced in Europe. The hole cam was patented by WSOP bracelet winner Henry Orenstein and first used in the Late Night Poker television series. It was used again in the inaugural Poker Million tournament in 2000 which boasted the attraction of the first £1,000,000 poker game on live television. By 1996, however, the ESPN one-hour highlight show only included hands that were shown down, so that the commentators, including Gabe Kaplan, could comment, in post-production, on the hands while they were being played out. The commentators referred to this as "taking a peek at the cards", and provided the first contemporary announcing on hands during the play in poker history. By 2001, however, Late Night Poker had been cancelled in the UK and televised poker could no longer be found in Europe. In the US, the 1999, 2000, and 2001 World Series of Poker events were only broadcast in one-hour documentaries on the Discovery Networks.

In 1999, documentary filmmaker Steven Lipscomb produced and directed a documentary on the WSOP for the Discovery Channel. It was the first U.S. poker production funded entirely by a television network rather than the casino. When the 1999 WSOP aired, it doubled its audience over the hour time slot. Seeing the audience reaction, Lipscomb believed there was an untapped market and began pitching poker series ideas to cable and network television. Because poker had been on the air for over twenty years, with little viewer interest, broadcasters were unwilling to commit resources to put a series on the air.

In October 2001, Lipscomb wrote a business plan. Along with poker player Mike Sexton and poker business woman Linda Johnson, Lipscomb approached casino mogul and avid poker player, Lyle Berman, whose company Lakes Entertainment agreed to fund the World Poker Tour (WPT)—the first organized and televised tour of poker tournaments in the world.

In June 2002, WPT filmed its first episode at Bellagio in Las Vegas. Wanting to create a compelling, action-packed show, WPT took eight months to edit the first WPT episode. ESPN, who resumed their coverage of the World Series of Poker in 2002, featured pocket cam technology in their return broadcast—albeit, in a very limited capacity—prior to the WPT's first show.

During this time, the “WPT Format” was created featuring the WPT hole cam, interactive graphics and “live sports feel”. These new features put viewers into the minds and at the heart of the action. The first WPT episode aired on March 30, 2003, on the Travel Channel and became an instant success (the highest rated show in network history).

A few months later, ESPN's broadcast of the 2003 World Series of Poker adopted many features characteristic of the emerging WPT series, with an improved graphic display detailing the exciting action of the Main Event's final table. This coupled with the unlikely outcome in the 2003 WSOP Main Event—where Tennessee accountant Chris Moneymaker won $2.5 million after winning his seat through a $39 PokerStars satellite tournament—and the ensuing publicity only further sparked the already accelerated interest in the game initiated by the WPT.

These events are considered the main contributor to poker's booming popularity—increasing the number of entrants into live poker tournaments (at all levels), the growth of online poker and the overall greater interest in the game—but above all others, the 2003 World Series of Poker Main Event (and subsequent broadcast on ESPN) is most cited as poker's Tipping Point; commonly referred to as the "Moneymaker Effect".

Poker gained further exposure in Canada and much of the United States as a result of the 2004-05 NHL lockout, which caused sports networks in both countries to air poker as replacement programming for their NHL coverage.

The much improved ratings of poker television programs from this point on lead to ESPN covering many more events of the World Series of Poker (in addition to the Main Event as in the past) since 2003, as well as covering some other tournaments outside of the World Series, such as the United States Poker Championship. Since its first broadcast, WPT has also expanded its tour stops from 12 events at seven casino partner locations to 23 domestic and international tournaments and 14 casino partners in Season VI.

Since the introduction of the hole cam and WPT television format, poker has become almost ubiquitous in the US and Europe. While poker originally aired on sports channels such as ESPN and Sky Sports has expanded to such "non traditional" networks as Bravo and GSN. All poker television programs make heavy use of the aforementioned pocket cam and television format, plus generally feature a "straightman" and a "comedian" type of commentators, with one often being a professional poker player.

With the ability to edit a tournament that lasts days into just a few hours, ESPN's World Series of Poker broadcasts generally focus on showing how various star players fared in each event. Key hands from throughout the many days of each year's WSOP Main Event are shown, and similar highly edited coverage of final tables is also provided. For the events in the WSOP before the Main Event, only the final table is covered in television coverage, similar to how the Main Event was televised before ESPN's airing of the 2003 World Series Main Event.

The World Poker Tour does not offer general coverage of the multi-day poker tournaments. Instead, the WPT covers only the action at the final table of each event. With aggressive play and increasing blinds and antes, the important action from a single table can easily be edited into a two-hour episode. Although the tournament fate of fewer stars are chronicled this way, it allows the drama to build more naturally toward the final heads up showdown.

Although most poker shows on television focus on tournaments, High Stakes Poker shows a high-stakes cash game. In this game professional and amateur players play no limit Texas Hold 'em with their own money (the minimum to enter the game is $100,000). This game has allowed spectators to observe differences between cash games and tournaments, and to see how players adjust their play to the different format.

Poker's growth in Europe led to the creation of two FTA channels: The Poker Channel and Pokerzone. Both began broadcasting during 2005.

Televised poker experienced a sudden disruption in 2011 after the lawsuit United States v. Scheinberg et al. was filed. Two of the defendants in that case, PokerStars and Full Tilt Poker, were the primary sponsors of most of the shows that were airing on American television at the time. Since it was discovered that online gambling (other than sports betting) was not illegal and the state law used to file the lawsuit was not applicable to foreign companies, the lawsuit was resolved in 2012, with the two companies merging and without any admission of guilt.

Although once popular, poker television programs have steadily lost their traditional broadcast audience and never fully recovered from the disruption caused by the Scheinberg lawsuit. ESPN aired the World Series of Poker through 2020, after which the series's domestic television rights passed to CBS Sports in 2021 alongside the PokerGO streaming service.

The over-the-top content platform PokerGO was launched in 2017 and is based in Las Vegas, Nevada. It is a subscription-based streaming service specializing in poker content including cash games, tournaments, and documentaries. PokerGO streamed the World Series of Poker from 2017 to 2020 in partnership with ESPN, before CBS Sports became the new domestic television partner in 2021.

In December 2022 on YouTube-based Hustler Casino Live, the biggest pot in televised U.S. poker broadcast history was set. The No-Limit Hold'em cash game had stakes of $200/$400/$800/$1,600 and Alan Keating would win the $1,158,000 pot with a flush against "Handz".

In February 2023 on PokerGO's No Gamble, No Future Cash of the Titans, Patrik Antonius would win a $1,978,000 pot with two pair against Eric Persson to break the record set on Hustler Casino Live. Following that record-breaking pot, there were three pots that also amounted to larger than the previous record pot that was set on Hustler Casino Live.

== Poker television programs ==
Here is a list of poker television programs that have aired on television in either North America or Europe.

=== North America ===
Program	Network	Years aired	Current commentators
World Series of Poker	CBS; ESPN; PokerGO; CBS Sports	1978–1981, 1983; 1987–2020^{1}; 2017 onwards^{2}; 2021 onwards^{3}	Lon McEachern, Norman Chad, Ali Nejad, Nick Schulman, Jeff Platt, Brent Hanks, David Tuchman, and Jamie Kerstetter
United States Poker Championship	ESPN	1997–2000; 2003-2006	Lon McEachern and Norman Chad
World Poker Tour	The Travel Channel; GSN; Fox Sports Net	2003–2007; 2008; 2009 onwards	Mike Sexton 2002–2017, Tony Dunst 2017- and Vince Van Patten
European Poker Tour	Sportsnet Canada	2004 onwards	James Hartigan and Joe Stapleton
Celebrity Poker Showdown	Bravo	2003–2006	Dave Foley and Phil Gordon
Poker Superstars Invitational Tournament	Fox Sports Net	2004 onwards	Chris Rose and Howard Lederer
Ultimate Poker Challenge	syndication	2004 onwards	Chad Brown and weekly guest
Poker Royale	GSN	2004–2005	John Ahlers and Robert Williamson III
High Stakes Poker	GSN; PokerGO	2006–2007; 2009-2011; 2020 onwards	Gabe Kaplan (Seasons 1-6, 8-10), A.J. Benza (Seasons 1-5, 8 - onwards), Kara Scott (Seasons 6-7), Norm Macdonald (Season 7), and Nick Schuman (Seasons 10 - onwards)
Professional Poker Tour	The Travel Channel	2006–2007	Matt Corboy and Mark Seif
National Heads-Up Poker Championship	NBC	2005 onwards	Matt Vasgersian and Gabe Kaplan
Poker Dome Challenge	Fox Sports Net	2006–2007	Barry Tompkins and Michael Konik
Poker After Dark	NBC; PokerGO	2007–2011; 2017–2021;	Oliver Nejad and weekly guests
Friday Night Poker	Stadium; PokerGO	2018	Jeff Platt, Brent Hanks, and Amanda Leatherman
Pro-Am Poker Equalizer	ESPN	2007	Phil Gordon and Oliver Nejad
Heartland Poker Tour	syndication	2005 onwards	Fred Bevill and Maria Ho
Pokerstars Big Game	Fox Network	2010-2011	Joe Stapleton Scott Huff Chris Rose Amanda Leatherman
Poker Night in America	CBS Sports Network	2014 onwards	Chris Hanson
Windy City Poker Championship	CSN Chicago; CSN California; Sun Sports	2008 onwards	Jason Finn and Kirk Fallah
High Stakes Duel	PokerGO	2020 onwards	Ali Nejad, Nick Schulman, and Maria Ho
Super High Roller Bowl	PokerGO	2015 onwards	Ali Nejad, Nick Schulman, Jeff Platt, and Brent Hanks
Poker Masters	PokerGO	2017 onwards	Ali Nejad, David Williams, Jeremy Ausmus, Jamie Kerstetter, Joey Ingram, and Maria Ho
U.S. Poker Open	PokerGO	2018 onwards	Ali Nejad, Jeff Platt, Brent Hanks, Jeremy Ausmus, Jamie Kerstetter, and Maria Ho
PokerGO Cup	PokerGO	2021 onwards	Ali Nejad, Jeff Platt, Brent Hanks, and Maria Ho
Triton Million	NBC; PokerGO	2021	Ali Nejad and Daniel Negreanu
No Gamble, No Future	PokerGO	2022 onwards	Jeff Platt and Brent Hanks

^{1} ESPN did not air the WSOP in 1996 or 1999–2001; The Discovery Channel did air one-hour specials of the 2000 & 2001 Main Events

^{2} World Series of Poker bracelets events and select coverage of the Main Event have streamed on exclusively on PokerGO from 2017 onwards.

^{3} In 2021, CBS Sports became the new domestic television partner for the WSOP alongside PokerGO.

=== Europe ===
Program	Network	Years aired	Current commentators
Late Night Poker	Channel 4 (UK); Fox Sports Net (US)	1999–2002, 2006 onwards	Jesse May and Barny Boatman (final season)
Poker Million	Sky Sports	2000, 2003 onwards	Jesse May and John Duthie
World Heads-Up Poker Championship	Unknown	2001 onwards	Unknown
Celebrity Poker Club	Challenge (UK)	2003 onwards	Jesse May and Victoria Coren
European Poker Tour	Channel 4 (UK)	2004 onwards	James Hartigan and Joe Stapleton
Victor Chandler Poker Cup	Sky Sports	2004 onwards	Jesse May and Barny Boatman
The Gaming Club World Poker Championship	Sky Sports	2004	Unknown
British Poker Open	The Poker Channel; PokerGO	2005 onwards	Jeff Platt and Brent Hanks
World Speed Poker Open	The Poker Channel	2005 onwards	Gary Jones, Roy Brindley, Lucy Rokach
Late Night Poker Ace	Channel 4 (UK)	2005 onwards	Jesse May and Simon Trumper
PartyPoker Poker Den (season 1-3, season 4 renamed to PartyPoker Big Game)	Challenge (UK)	2005 onwards	Grub Smith and Tony Cascarino
William Hill Poker Grand Prix	Sky Sports	2006 onwards	Jesse May, Andrew Black, Lucy Rokach
Poker Nations Cup	Channel 4 (UK)	2006 onwards	Jesse May, Barny Boatman and Padraig Parkinson
PartyPoker.com Football & Poker Legends Cup	Five (UK)	2006 onwards	Jesse May, Padraig Parkinson and Ken Lennaárd
Pokerheaven.com Online Series of Poker	CNBC	2006 onwards	Unknown
Fulltiltpoker.com Million Dollar Cash Game	Sky Sports	2006 onwards	Unknown
La Notte del Poker	SKY Sport 2	2006 onwards	Pupo, Zero Assoluto, Chiara Edelfa Masciotta
Pokermania	Italia 1 (Italy)	2007 onwards	Ciccio Valenti and Luca Pagano
