= High Stakes Duel =

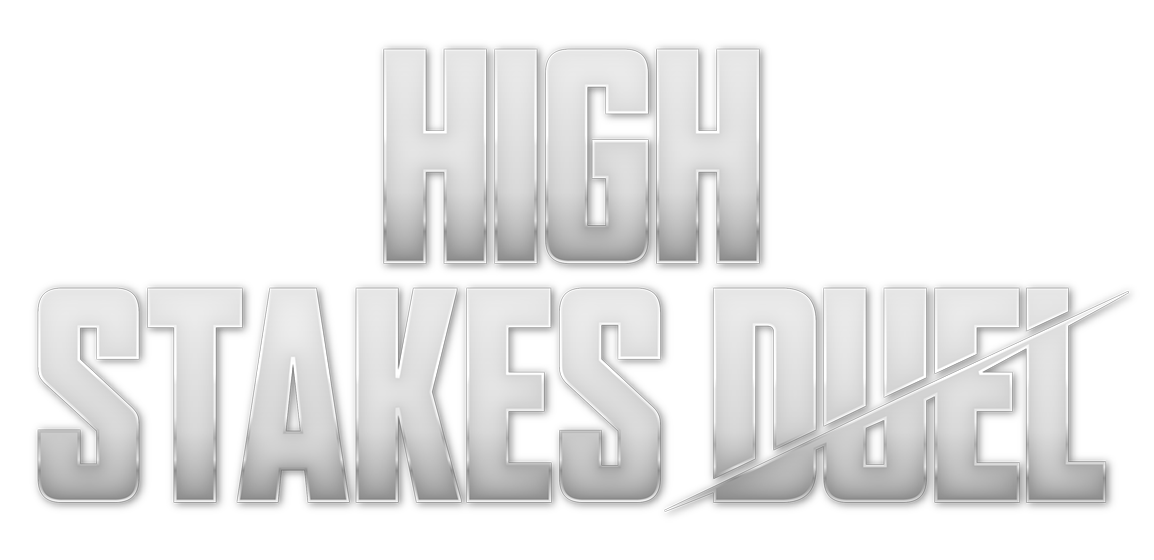
- Presented by: Ali Nejad; Nick Schulman; Maria Ho; Phil Galfond; Brent Hanks
- Country of origin: United States
- No. of seasons: 4

Production
- Producer: PokerGO
- Production location: Las Vegas, Nevada

Original release
- Release: July 30, 2020

High Stakes Duel is an American poker television program that airs on PokerGO and premiered on July 30, 2020. The original series was announced by PokerGO on July 22, 2020, and would see two players play heads-up No-Limit Hold'em in a poker tournament format to decide a winner.

The show is filmed exclusively in the PokerGO Studio at ARIA Resort & Casino in Las Vegas, Nevada, and is aired on PokerGO and PokerGO's YouTube channel.

Per the rules of High Stakes Duel, the initial buy-in level is $50,000 for Round 1. With each round that follows, the buy-ins double. Round 2 is a $100,000 buy-in, Round 3 is a $200,000 buy-in, and so on. A player earns the right to walk away as High Stakes Duel champion if the player wins three consecutive matches prior to Round 4 or two consecutive matches starting with Round 4. The winner of High Stakes Duel receives the High Stakes Duel Championship Belt.

== Format ==
High Stakes Duel is a series of heads-up poker matches. The first round of High Stakes Duel has a $50,000 buy-in with the two players involved playing No-Limit Hold'em in a heads-up poker tournament format to decide the winner who advances to Round 2. The player that lost the match has the first option to challenge the winner to a rematch in Round 2 where the stakes will double to $100,000 per player. If the player that lost decides not to challenge for a rematch, then the challenger seat is open to any player. The stakes double each round, and in order for a player to walk away with the prize pool, they must win three consecutive matches before Round 4 or two consecutive matches starting with Round 4.

== Results ==
High Stakes Duel Results
Series	Total Rounds	Winner	Opponent(s)	Winnings
High Stakes Duel 1	3	Phil Hellmuth	Antonio Esfandiari	$400,000
High Stakes Duel 2	3	Phil Hellmuth	Daniel Negreanu	$400,000
High Stakes Duel 3	5	Jason Koon	No challenger	$1,600,000
High Stakes Duel 4	2	Daniel Negreanu	Doug Polk	$200,000

== History ==
After premiering on July 30, 2020, High Stakes Duel has now completed its third series, High Stakes Duel 3. Jason Koon defeated Phil Hellmuth in High Stakes Duel 3 Round 5, and when no challenger stepped forward, Koon was declared the winner.

=== High Stakes Duel 1 ===
Round 1 of High Stakes Duel premiered on July 30, 2020, with Phil Hellmuth and Antonio Esfandiari facing off in the inaugural match of this PokerGO original series. Each player bought in for $50,000.

Esfandiari took the early lead in the match before Hellmuth turned the tide and mounted a comeback. The final hand saw Hellmuth win a race holding pocket sevens against Esfandiari's queen-jack. Following the match, Esfandiari immediately issued his challenge for Round 2.

Round 2 of High Stakes Duel aired on September 24, 2020, with Hellmuth and Esfandiari putting up $100,000 each. The two went back and forth throughout the match before Esfandiari's jack-ten couldn't outdraw Hellmuth's king-ten. Like in Round 1, Esfandiari challenged Hellmuth for a rematch.

Round 3 of High Stakes Duel aired on October 21, 2020, with Hellmuth and Esfandiari playing for $400,000 having each bought in for $200,000 each. Hellmuth dominated Esfandiari throughout the match as the final hand saw Esfandiari all-in with ace-three against Hellmuth's ace-ten. Both players flopped an ace, and Esfandiari's chop outs never fulfilled as he was handed his third consecutive loss to Hellmuth. Esfandiari was out of challenges, and with Hellmuth having the option to cash out the $400,000 prize pool or take on a new challenger in Round 4, Hellmuth decided to cash out and was crowned the High Stakes Duel winner and awarded the High Stakes Duel Championship Belt.

=== High Stakes Duel 2 ===
High Stakes Duel 2 was announced in March 2021 with a highly anticipated match between the defending champion Phil Hellmuth and his newest challenger Daniel Negreanu. Round 1 of High Stakes Duel 2 premiered on March 31, 2021, with Hellmuth and Negreanu each buying in for $50,000. Negreanu dominated the match from the start before Hellmuth mounted an epic comeback that saw him as low as 7,000 of the 100,000 chips in play. Once the tide had turned and Negreanu was short, he would run into Hellmuth's pocket nines and fail to improve. Negreanu immediately challenged Hellmuth for Round 2.

Round 2 of High Stakes Duel 2 aired on May 5, 2021, with Hellmuth and Negreanu each buying in for $100,000. Unlike the previous match, this one saw many lead changes between Hellmuth and Negreanu before the final hand saw Hellmuth shove ace-four and Negreanu called with a pair. Hellmuth would make a runner-runner flush and secure his second consecutive victory over Negreanu.

Round 3 of High Stakes Duel 2 aired on June 23, 2021, with Hellmuth and Negreanu buying in for $200,000 each. The long battle would see just a few lead changes before the final hand saw both players turn a gutshot straight. Hellmuth held the higher superior, and with all the chips in the middle, Negreanu was unable to find a chop on the river to lose his third consecutive match against Hellmuth. Negreanu was out of challenges, and like in High Stakes Duel, Hellmuth elected to cash out the $400,000 prize pool instead of taking on a new challenger in Round 4.

=== High Stakes Duel 3 ===
High Stakes Duel 3 was announced in June 2021 on PokerGO's video podcast No Gamble, No Future. The show was set to reveal Phil Hellmuth's opponent for High Stakes Duel 3, and No Gamble, No Future hosts Jeff Platt and Brent Hanks introduced Fox Sports 1's Nick Wright as Hellmuth's Round 1 opponent. Round 1 of High Stakes Duel 3 premiered on July 28, 2021, with Hellmuth and Wright each buying in for $50,000. Wright took the early lead in the match before Hellmuth staged a comeback before the final hand saw both players turn a flush with Hellmuth's being superior. Wright announced via Twitter that he would not challenge Hellmuth for Round 2.

Tom Dwan was revealed as Hellmuth's Round 2 opponent which premiered on August 25, 2021, with each buying in for $100,000. The Round 2 match began with Dwan taking the early lead before it rotated back-and-forth between both players. Dwan would push Hellmuth off a small pair and then make a straight against his bluff to take his biggest lead in the match. Hellmuth eventually sunk down to around 20 big blinds before he limped with pocket aces. Dwan flopped a pair and the rest of the chips entered the middle with Hellmuth at-risk. Dwan turned two pair, and when Hellmuth failed to improve on the river, he was dealt his first High Stakes Duel loss.

Round 3 of High Stakes Duel 3 was announced for January 26, 2022, with Dwan and Hellmuth buying in for $200,000 each. Hellmuth would rejoin the winner's circle when he shoved all-in with ace-king and Dwan called all-in with pocket eights. A king landed on the flop, and Hellmuth advanced into Round 4.

Dwan was originally scheduled to play Hellmuth in Round 4, but due to a scheduling conflict, backed out. Dwan's replacement would be announced as Scott Seiver, and the two would face off on May 17, 2022. Both players battled back and forth during Round 4 before Hellmuth flopped two pair against Seiver's top pair. All the money went in, and when Seiver was unable to improve, it would be Hellmuth advancing to Round 5.

During the 2022 World Series of Poker, Hellmuth announced via Twitter that he would face Seiver in August in the Round 5 match for $1,600,000. Like Dwan, Seiver backed out of his match against Hellmuth to leave the door open for a new challenger to step into the ring.

Jason Koon stepped in and put up $800,000 to face Hellmuth in Round 5. Hellmuth and Koon squared off at the PokerGO Studio in Las Vegas, with the match airing on December 7, 2022. Koon took a big chip lead early in the match and was able to finish the job from there, ending the High Stakes Duel run of Hellmuth and advancing to Round 6. Hellmuth opted not to rematch Koon, and when no challenger stepped up to take on Koon by January 6, 2023, Koon was declared the winner of High Stakes Duel 3.

=== High Stakes Duel 4 ===
High Stakes Duel 4 was announced in April 2023 with a new format that would see a player only needing to win two consecutive matches to cash out. Also new for High Stakes Duel 4 was the addition of an undercard match. The undercard match would feature Shaun Deeb playing Mike Matusow for $10,000 each, while the Round 1 match would be between Daniel Negreanu and Eric Persson for $50,000 each.

The High Stakes Duel 4 undercard match was played between Deeb and Matusow on May 5, 2023. Matusow emerged victorious over Deeb to earn the $20,000 payday. On May 8, 2023, Negreanu would face Persson as the match ended with Persson all-in holding ace-queen against Negreanu's ace-king. The board bricked out and Negreanu earned his first High Stakes Duel victory in his fourth attempt. Although Persson had originally opted in for the rematch, he then was forced to back out due to scheduling conflicts. In June 2023, PokerGO announced that Doug Polk would be stepping in to play Negreanu in Round 2 for $100,000 each.

On August 24, 2023, Polk took his seat in the challenger seat across from Negreanu. Polk took the early lead with an all-in river shove holding a flush, but Negreanu stormed back into the lead after flopping a flush with ace-jack. The final hand played out with Polk shoving the river with a missed straight draw, and Negreanu called with top pair. In his post-match interview, Negreanu announced that he was done and would be cashing out his $200,000 to put an end to High Stakes Duel 4.
