= Poker Night in America =

- Starring: Joe Stapleton; Chris Hanson; Doug Polk
- Country of origin: United States
- No. of seasons: 10

Production
- Producers: Todd Anderson; Rush Street Productions
- Production location: United States

Original release
- Network: CBS Sports; Comcast
- Release: 2014

Poker Night in America (PNIA) is a poker television program which features cash games and sit & gos. The series production began in 2013 and was first aired in 2014. The show is web streamed and televised. PNIA was developed by Todd Anderson, president of Rush Street Productions and co-founder of the Heartland Poker Tour.

The show hosts various cash games at local casinos across the United States and is sponsored by 888poker. During the filming of the season one Shaun Deeb slow rolled Mike Matusow with quad 5s resulting in Matusow having an outburst. Since the incident, slow rolling has become a tradition on the show. Professional poker players such as Danielle Andersen, Maria Ho, Alec Torelli, Layne Flack, Phil Laak, Tom Schneider and others have appeared on the show.

In 2017, the show presented King of the Hill, a series of $50,000 buy in heads up sit & gos with players such as Daniel Cates, Phil Hellmuth, Doug Polk, Olivier Busquet, Dan Colman and Parker Talbot competing for a $200,000 prize.

Joe Stapleton and Chris Hanson were the commentators for the first 6 seasons.

== Studio 52 ==
After nine seasons of filming in casinos across America, PNIA announced a Las Vegas "poker residency" on May 8, 2023. Inspired by Hugh Hefner's 1959 television show, "Playboy's Penthouse", Anderson created a TV studio in the 10,000-square foot private mansion where he resides in Las Vegas and branded it "Studio 52". The TV-ready property is outfitted with a full Poker Night in America production set, high-tech commentary suite, backyard wine cave, and outdoor game pavilion.

Notable figures who have played poker at Studio 52 include Dan Shak, Jason Somerville, Phil Galfond, Farah Fath, and Maria Konnikova.
