= Pro-Am Poker Equalizer =

The Pro-Am Poker Equalizer is a televised poker tournament in which professional poker players play Texas hold 'em against celebrities which began airing on ESPN in January 2007. In order to "equalize" the playing field, the celebrities start the tournament with 50% more chips than the professionals. The Pro-Am Poker Equalizer is commentated by Phil Gordon and Ali Nejad. The winners of each of the six regular episodes will face off in the final episode for a $500,000 grand prize.

== Episodes ==
Six episodes of the Equalizer have been produced, featuring commentary by Phil Gordon and Ali Nejad, and sideline reporting and interviews by Mieke Buchan. The series features the following celebrities and pros:

Episode 1 (first aired January 7, 2007):

- Phil Ivey (episode winner)
- John Juanda
- Erick Lindgren
- Daniel Negreanu
- José Canseco
- Cheryl Hines

Episode 2:

- Johnny Chan
- Gus Hansen
- Mike Matusow
- Shawn Sheikhan
- Yancey Arias
- Nicholas Gonzalez (episode winner)

Episode 3:

- Allen Cunningham (episode winner)
- Ted Forrest
- Clonie Gowen
- David Williams
- Penn Jillette
- Jennifer Tilly (as a celebrity despite having won a bracelet at the World Series of Poker)

Episode 4:

- Chris Ferguson
- Jennifer Harman
- Phil Laak (episode winner)
- Howard Lederer
- Cindy Margolis
- Jeremy Sisto

Episode 5:

- Andy Bloch (episode winner)
- Gabe Kaplan
- Erik Seidel
- Gavin Smith
- Don Cheadle
- Shannon Elizabeth

Episode 6:

- David Benyamine
- Jamie Gold
- Jeff Madsen
- Huck Seed (episode winner)
- Jason Alexander
- Shana Hiatt

Championship:

- Huck Seed
- Andy Bloch (champion - $500,000)
- Phil Laak (runner up - $150,000)
- Allen Cunningham
- Nicholas Gonzalez
- Phil Ivey
