= No Gamble, No Future =

American poker television program

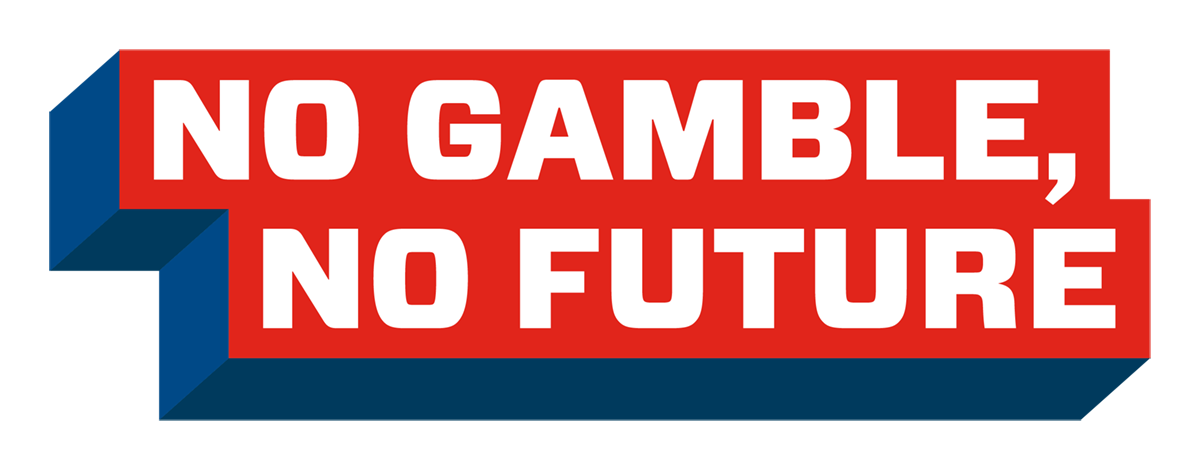
- Presented by: Brent Hanks; Jeff Platt
- Country of origin: United States
- No. of seasons: 8
- No. of episodes: 67

Production
- Producer: PokerGO
- Production location: Las Vegas, Nevada

Original release
- Release: August 1, 2022

No Gamble, No Future is an American poker television program that airs on PokerGO, and premiered on August 1, 2022. The original series was announced by PokerGO on July 21, 2022, and provide cash game-focused entertainment with a variety of stakes and players partaking.

The show is filmed exclusively in the PokerGO Studio at ARIA Resort & Casino in Las Vegas, Nevada, and is hosted by Brent Hanks and Jeff Platt.

== History ==
No Gamble, No Future began as a video podcast in January 2021 with Hanks and Platt as the hosts. The show aired on Tuesdays across PokerGO's YouTube and Facebook channels and discussed poker, sports, and gambling.

Guests included Phil Hellmuth, Daniel Negreanu, Nick Schulman, Ali Nejad, Antonio Esfandiari, Patrik Antonius, Jennifer Tilly, Andrew Robl, Tom Dwan, Barstool Sports' Ben Mintz, and Fox Sports 1's Nick Wright.

While the podcast was on break, No Gamble, No Future remained a popular PokerGO brand before it evolved into a cash game show to be aired on video streaming service PokerGO.

In February 2023, No Gamble, No Future aired Cash of the Titans that featured a hand between Patrik Antonius and Eric Persson that totaled $1,978,000 and broke the record for largest pot in U.S. poker stream history.

== Episodes ==
=== Season 1 (2022) ===
Season 1 was taped in July 2022 from inside the PokerGO Studio at ARIA Resort & Casino in Las Vegas, Nevada. It aired from August 23, 2022, to January 10, 2023.

Week	Episodes	Scheduled Airdates	Seat 1	Seat 2	Seat 3	Seat 4	Seat 5	Seat 6	Seat 7
1	4	Aug. 23, 30, Sep. 6, 13	Matt Hanks	Patrik Antonius	Ryusuke Daifuku	Matthew Su	Eric Hicks	Dylan DeStefano	Eric Persson
2	4	Sep. 20, Oct.4, 11, 18	Matt Berkey	Bob Bright	Nick Schulman	Jimmy D'Ambrosio	Jake Daniels	Justin Young	David Levy
3	3	Oct. 25, Nov. 1, 8	Lynne Ji	Brett McCollum	Jake Daniels	David Levy	Nikolai Novak	Eric Hicks	Eli Elezra
4	3	Nov. 15, 22, 29	Michael Ian Black	Chris Eubank Jr.	Brent Hanks / Kevin Pollak	Maria Ho	Natalia Cigliuti	Daryl Morey	Simon Yu
5	2	Dec. 6, 13	Maria Ho	Darly Morey	Faizal Khoja	Eli Elezra	Rob Mariano	Christina Gollins	Jeremy Ausmus
6	4	Dec. 20, 27, Jan. 3, 10	Matt Hanks	Eric Hicks	Eric Persson	Adi Chugh	Alan Keating	Jean-Robert Bellande	Pedro Velasco Adnet

- Week 5 was a $10,000 buy-in sit-n-go. Maria Ho defeated Faizal Khoja and won $50,000.

=== Season 2 (2023) ===
Season 2 was taped in November 2022 from inside the PokerGO Studio at ARIA Resort & Casino in Las Vegas, Nevada. It aired from March 22 to May 25, 2023.

Week	Episodes	Scheduled Airdates	Seat 1	Seat 2	Seat 3	Seat 4	Seat 5	Seat 6	Seat 7
1	4	Mar. 22, 29	Eric Hicks	Pennzoil Don	David Oppenheim	Mr Dr Batman	Evan Sofer	James Bord	Eric Persson
2	3	Apr. 5, 12, 19	Evan Sofer	Justin Young	Eric Hicks	Eric Worre	Eric Wasserson	James Bord / Patrik Antonius	Eric Persson
3	3	Apr. 26, May 3, 10	Shawn Madden	Jared Jaffee	Steven Buckner / James Bullimore	Kevin Martin	Sashimi Poker	Justin Young	Jimmy D'Ambrosio
4	2	May 17	Brian Okin	Straton Wilhelm	Joe Tehan	Andy Loomis	Markus Gonsalves	Justin Young	Julian Parmann
5	4	May 24, 25	Matt Hanks	Kevin Martin / Eric Persson	Markus Gonsalves	Chris Moneymaker	Eric Worre	Shawn Madden	Eric Hicks

- Season 2 introduced the "Wheel of Pain" that was hosted by Remko Rinkema and would be spun by players when they triggered certain in-game conditions. Punishments included wearing funny outfits, doing push-ups or jumping jacks, and praising Phil Hellmuth as the GOAT.

=== Season 3 (2023) ===
Season 3 was taped in February 2023 from inside the PokerGO Studio at ARIA Resort & Casino in Las Vegas, Nevada. It aired from July 19 to November 22, 2023.

Week	Episodes	Scheduled Airdates	Seat 1	Seat 2	Seat 3	Seat 4	Seat 5	Seat 6	Seat 7
1	3	Jul. 19, 26, Aug. 2	Markus Gonsalves	Rob Yong	Matthew Gonzales	Andrew Robl	Patrik Antonius	Eric Persson	
2	3	Aug. 9, 16, 23	Markus Gonsalves	Matthew Gonzales	Patrik Antonius	Rob Yong	Andrew Robl	Eric Persson	
3	4	Aug. 30, Sep. 6, 13, Oct. 4	Andrew Robl	Eric Persson	Matthew Gonzales	Rob Yong	Patrik Antonius	Markus Gonsalves	
4	3	Oct. 11, 25, Nov. 1	Phil Hellmuth	Lynne Ji	Arden Cho	Lawford Edwards	Matt Steinberg	Justin Young	Shawn Madden
5	3	Nov. 8, 15, 22	Eric Hicks	Kevin Martin / Matt Berkey	Daniel Negreanu	Matt Steinberg	Lynne Ji	Phil Hellmuth	Eli Elezra

In February 2023, No Gamble, No Future premiered Cash of the Titans that featured Andrew Robl, Eric Persson, Rob Yong, Markus Gonsalves, Matthew Gonzales, and Patrik Antonius. The buy-in was $1,000,000 and stakes began at $500/$500 blinds that escalated every three hours over three days. Each player put $100,000 on the side, and the player that won the most money would win the $600,000 side pot. On the final hand day of filming, there was a $1,978,000 pot between Antonius and Persson that set the record for the biggest pot in U.S. poker stream history.

With blinds at $1,000 / $2,000 and a $2,000 big blind ante, Persson raised to $7,000 with Q♥ 9♥ and Yong called on the button with A♣ 2♣. Antonius made it $30,000 from the small blind with A♥ K♥ and both Persson and Yong called. Antonius bet $40,000 on the 3♥ 3♣ 8♥ flop and Persson raised to $140,000. Yong folded and Antonius reraised to $250,000. Persson called and the turn landed the A♠. Antonius bet $150,000 and Persson moved all-in. Antonius called all-in for $692,000 and had Persson drawing dead as the river fell the J♠. Following the record-breaking pot, there were three pots of $1,657,000, $1,298,000, and $1,269,000 that also amounted to larger than the previous $1,158,000 record pot that was set in December 2022 on Hustler Casino Live.

=== Season 4 (2024) ===
Season 4 was taped in August 2023 from inside the PokerGO Studio at ARIA Resort & Casino in Las Vegas, Nevada. It aired from November 29, 2023, to March 13, 2024.

Week	Episodes	Scheduled Airdates	Seat 1	Seat 2	Seat 3	Seat 4	Seat 5	Seat 6	Seat 7
1	3	Nov. 29, Dec. 6	Andrew Sasson	Antonio Esfandiari	Brandon Steven	Jennifer Tilly	John Morgan	Alex Dombroff	
2	2	Dec. 13, 20	Hoodie Allen	Brettski	Justin Young	Mitchell Bank	Jimmy D'Ambrosio	Bijan Shapouri	BensBenz
3	3	Dec. 27, Jan. 3, 17	Eli Elezra	Nik Airball	Pink	Jennifer Tilly	Phil Hellmuth	Eric Persson	
4	2	Jan. 24, Feb. 7	Phil Hellmuth	Nik Airball	Professor	Charles Yu	Jennifer Tilly	Pink	Eli Elezra
5	2	Feb. 14, 21	Straton Wilhelm / Julian Parmann	Brandon Adams	Joel Prelog / Paul Gunness	Justin Young	Jimmy D'Ambrosio	Nik Airball	Matt Berkey
6	3	Feb. 28, Mar. 6, 13	Nik Airball	Professor	Brandon Adams	Matt Kirk	Jean-Robert Bellande	Eric Wong	Charles Yu

=== Season 5 (2024) ===
Season 5 was taped in February 2024 from inside the PokerGO Studio at ARIA Resort & Casino in Las Vegas, Nevada. It aired from July 24, 2024 to December 11, 2024.

Week	Episodes	Scheduled Airdates	Seat 1	Seat 2	Seat 3	Seat 4	Seat 5	Seat 6	Seat 7
1	4	Jul. 24, 31, Aug. 7, 14	Humboldt Mike	Phil Hellmuth	Nik Airball	Alan Keating	Matt Hanks	Ryan Feldman	Jean-Robert Bellande
2	3	Aug. 21, 28, Sep. 4	Joel Prelog	Phil Hellmuth	Sashimi Poker	Mike Burns	Julian Parmann	Shawn Madden	Justin Young
3	2	Sep. 25, Oct. 2	Jared Bleznick	Wolfgang	Humboldt Mike	Sashimi Poker	Markus Gonsalves	Randy "3Coin" Sadler	Jimmy D'Ambrosio
4	3	Oct. 9, 16, 23	Markus Gonsalves	Sashimi Poker	Ethan Yau	Wolfgang	Randy "3Coin" Sadler	Jimmy D'Ambrosio	Jared Bleznick
5	7	Oct. 30, Nov. 6, 13, 20, 27, Dec. 4, 11	Shawn Madden	Stanley Choi	Justin Young	Mike Volfson	Andrew Robl	Sean Perry	Kristen Foxen

The conclusion of Season 5 of No Gamble, No Future, would see the return of Cash of the Titans that featured Andrew Robl, Kristen Foxen, Sean Perry, Justin Young, Stanley Choi, Shawn Madden, and Mike Volfson. The stakes begin at $100/$200 and climb to $500/$1,000 by the final session, and players are allowed two $100,000 buy-ins. Each player has also put $100,000 on the side with cash bonuses awarded to the biggest winner on Day 1, Day 2, and the overall biggest winner. On the final hand of Episode 19, Perry was leading as the biggest winner, but a pot between Robl and Foxen totaling $497,500 would swing the win to Foxen, and she was crowned the Cash of the Titans champion.

=== Season 6 (2025) ===
Season 6 was taped in November 2024 from inside the PokerGO Studio at ARIA Resort & Casino in Las Vegas, Nevada. It aired from February 25, 2025, to May 27, 2025.

Week	Episodes	Scheduled Airdates	Seat 1	Seat 2	Seat 3	Seat 4	Seat 5	Seat 6	Seat 7
1	3	Feb. 25, Mar. 4	Joel Prelog	Justin Young	Markus Gonsalves	Ethan Yau	Randy "3Coin" Sadler / Paul Gunness	Luiz Rizental	Wolfgang
2	2	Mar. 11, 18	Wolfgang	Justin Young	Matt Berkey	Ethan Yau	Shawn Madden	Luiz Rizental	Markus Gonsalves
3	3	Mar. 25, Apr. 1, 22	Caitlin Comesky	Jimmy D'Ambrosio	Kasey Mills	Sashimi Poker	Joe Stapleton	Shawn Madden	Justin Young
4	3	Apr. 29, May 6, 13	Rania Nasreddine	Matt Hanks	Phil Laak	Josh Greenly	Eric Hicks	Vinny Lingham	Antonio Esfandiari
5	3	May 20, 27	Antonio Esfandiari	Josh Greenly	Kirk Brown	Darin Feinstein / Eric Hicks	Jennifer Tilly	Andrew Sasson	Matt Hanks

=== Season 7 (2025) ===
Season 7 was taped in March 2025 from inside the PokerGO Studio at ARIA Resort & Casino in Las Vegas, Nevada. It aired from July 22, 2025, to October 28, 2025, and included a special livestream on PokerGO of the Week 5 lineup on March 10, 2025.

Week	Episodes	Scheduled Airdates	Seat 1	Seat 2	Seat 3	Seat 4	Seat 5	Seat 6	Seat 7	Seat 8
1	3	Jul. 22, Aug. 5	Taylor Wilson / Rips	Rips / Justin Gavri	Darin Feinstein	Justin Gavri / Jon Isaac	Andrew Robl	Kirk Brown	Garrett Adelstein	Shawn Madden
2	3	Aug. 12, 19, 26	Andrew Robl	Justin Gavri	Jon Isaac / Andy Kim	Andrew Pacheco	Shawn Madden	Stanley Tang	Garrett Adelstein	
3	3	Sep. 2, 9, 16	Pedro Velasco Adnet	Freddy Hamad	Pink	Alex Aqel	Phil Hellmuth	Jennifer Tilly	Randy "3Coin" Sadler	Luiz Rizental
4	3	Sep. 23, 30, Oct. 7	Taylor Wilson	Randy "3Coin" Sadler	Pink	Freddy Hamad	Jennifer Tilly	Rips	Alex Aqel	
5	3	Oct. 14, 21, 28	Ethan Klein	Taylor Wilson	Joe Stapleton	Daniel Schill	Phil Hellmuth	Jennifer Tilly	Nick Wright	Rips

=== Season 8 (2025) ===
Season 8 was taped in November 2025 from inside the PokerGO Studio at ARIA Resort & Casino in Las Vegas, Nevada. It aired as livestreams on PokerGO from November 13, 2025, to November 16, 2025.

Week	Episodes	Scheduled Airdates	Seat 1	Seat 2	Seat 3	Seat 4	Seat 5	Seat 6	Seat 7
1	tbd	Nov. 13	Luiz Rizental	Phil Hellmuth	Abby Merk	Randy "3Coin" Sadler	Jennifer Tilly	Jimmy D'Ambrosio	Shaun Deeb
2	tbd	Nov. 14	David "ODB" Baker	Shaun Deeb	Phil Hellmuth	Luiz Rizental	Abby Merk	Jimmy D'Ambrosio	Randy "3Coin" Sadler
3	tbd	Nov. 15	Sam Kiki	David Benyamine	Kevin "ATM" Paque	Jon Isaac	Teun Mulder	Matt Berkey	Matt Hanks
4	tbd	Nov. 16	Sam Kiki	Phil Hellmuth	Gaston Carrera	Eric Wasserson	Matt Berkey	David Benyamine	Kevin "ATM" Paque

== Results ==
=== Season 1 (2022) ===
Week	Winner	Runner-up	3rd place	4th Place	5th Place	6th Place	7th Place
5	Maria Ho	Faizal Khoja	Jeremy Ausmus	Rob Mariano	Daryl Morey	Christina Gollins	Eli Elezra
