= PokerStars Big Game =

- Presented by: PokerStars.net
- Starring: Amanda Leatherman; Chris Rose; Joe Stapleton; Scott Huff
- Country of origin: United States
- Original language: English
- No. of seasons: 3
- No. of episodes: 125

Production
- Executive producers: Mark Mayer, M&M Productions

Original release
- Network: Fox
- Release: June 14, 2010 – July 22, 2011

The PokerStars Big Game, also known as the PokerStars.net Big Game or simply the Big Game, was a poker television program sponsored by Pokerstars.net originally airing on Fox Network. The program had a tie-in to the Pokerstars North American Poker Tour (NAPT), which was shut down by the U.S. Attorney's Office for the Southern District of New York after the second season had been filmed in 2011. The PokerStars.net Big Game did not return after the second season. In October 2023, it was announced the show would return with the loose cannon being staked $50,000. The new show premiered on YouTube on May 11, 2024, as The Big Game on Tour.

== Format ==
The Big Game pits an amateur, known as the "loose cannon," who plays 150 hands of no limit Texas hold 'em poker, against five other players, each of whom stake their own money. These five players are mostly professionals, although wealthier amateurs also play occasionally. The game was advertised to consist of thirty hands per day over the course of five weekdays; however, by observing the players and host's clothing it is clear that each "week" was shot in a single session over the course of one day.

To become a contestant, the would-be loose cannon must be a citizen of the United States or Canada. He or she must first make it through three free qualifying rounds on PokerStars.net, placing in the top 300 in a daily tournament, then in the top 1000 on Saturday, and finally in the top 200 on Sunday. The remaining 200 send in video auditions, from which the producers select the contestant for the week.

The loose cannons are each staked $100,000 and keep all winnings in excess of this initial amount. To prevent the loose cannon from simply going "all in" (betting everything) immediately, betting is pot limit before the flop and no limit after the flop. The minimum buy-in for the other players is $100,000 and the maximum is $500,000. They may rebuy up to $500,000. The blinds are $200/$400 with a $100 ante which is paid for all players by the player on the designated dealer "button".

The highest-earning loose cannon at the end of the season wins an additional prize, a North American Poker Tour (NAPT) "passport" valued at $50,000, consisting of entry fees and expenses for various NAPT tournaments. In season one, if a loose cannon had a profit after 150 hands, they had the option of returning the next week for a chance to further increase their winnings.

Among the professionals who played were Doyle Brunson, Phil Hellmuth, Joe Hachem, Tony G, Antonio Esfandiari, Chau Giang, Todd Brunson, Barry Greenstein, Daniel Negreanu, Phil Laak, Jason Mercier, Joe Cada, Scott Seiver, Vanessa Rousso, Isaac Haxton, Justin Bonomo and Daniel Alaei. Most (but not all) of the professionals were sponsored by Pokerstars.

== Season one ==
In the conclusion of the first season, on the last day, Bob Ferdinand won two all-in hands and doubled his money twice to take the grand prize. He first went from losing over $30,000 to winning over $40,000 when he made a straight on the flop, which improved to a straight flush on the river. A few hands later, he was dealt pocket aces and was lucky enough to have another player pick up pocket kings, leading to a gain of over $140,000 when the flop came A66, giving him a full house. His final total profit of $181,500 easily exceeded the $129,600 won by David Fishman, who was in attendance.

Four loose cannons came away with some money, with Nadya Magnus in third position with $63,600, followed by Ernest Wiggins with $50,300.

Season one was commentated by Joe Stapleton and Chris Rose.

=== Season one "Loose Cannons" ===
Week 1: Ernest Wiggins from Washington D.C. He became interested in poker while he dated a professional player, and now he competes in local home games where he has been somewhat successful. Total Winnings: $50,300

Week 2: William Davis from Hilliard, Ohio. He spends most of his time playing poker in medium stakes home games and online. He is now trying to make a living playing poker. Busted by Daniel Negreanu.

Week 3: Nadya Magnus. Magnus has had the poker fever ever since she visited Las Vegas in 2008. She now regularly plays in the U.S., and has won a ladies event in the 2009 World Series Circuit Event. Total Winnings: $63,600

Week 4: Troy Howard. He is a music producer from Lansing, Michigan. Howard started playing poker with his friends. They started their own amateur league, where Troy has become a regular player. Busted by Rick Rahim.

Week 5: Aaron Jensen. Jensen is a competitive poker player from Seattle, Washington. He has had a good amount of success at the poker table, where he has picked up five-digit winnings at several live events. Busted by Daniel Negreanu.

Week 6: Andre Capella. He has been an amateur poker player for many years. He has placed in several events in places such as Reno and Lake Tahoe. Busted by Dani Stern.

Weeks 7 and 8: Russell Harlow. Harlow is a delivery driver from Manchester, Connecticut, where he resides with his wife and three kids. He aspires to own his own farm one day, but for now he intends to use his twenty years of poker experience to provide for his family. Harlow became the first and only loose cannon to come back another week after ending Week 7 with a profit of $16,400, but was busted on the final day of Week 8 by Barry Greenstein.

Week 9: Elizabeth Houston. Houston is a former eBay employee from Stony Plain, Alberta, Canada. She spends a lot of time in a casino perfecting her game, which she claimed to have learned from her hero, Doyle Brunson. Busted by Daniel Negreanu.

Week 10: David Fishman. Fishman is a cancer survivor from Tempe, Arizona, where he teaches mathematics. He considers his ability with numbers to be his biggest advantage at the poker table. Total Winnings: $129,600

Week 11: William Given. Given is from Lincoln, New Brunswick and has also lived in Germany. He enjoys sports and poker, and planned to put any winnings into a store that will sell hobby gear that will include poker. Busted by Doyle Brunson.

Week 12: Bob Ferdinand. He is a bus driver from Revere, Massachusetts. He has two kids, and is recently retired. His focus is now on becoming a full-time poker player. Total Winnings: $181,500

== Season two ==
The rules were changed so that loose cannons no longer had the option to come back for another week.

Season two was commentated by Joe Stapleton and Scott Huff.

=== Season two "Loose Cannons" ===
Week 1: Gonzales Cannon II, an online qualifier from Sacramento. Total Winnings: $155,200

Week 2: Courtney Gee. Based in British Columbia, Canada. Busted by Rick Salomon.

Week 3: Jared Huggins. A native of Manhattan Beach in California. Busted by Nick Cassavetes.

Week 4: Massimiliano Martinez. A medical student at university in Rome. Total Winnings: $163,200

Week 5: Cari Bershell from Las Vegas. Works as an Admissions Officer at DeVry University. Total Winnings: $26,900

Week 6: Ken Hrankowski, a retired police officer from Maple Ridge in British Columbia. Total Winnings: $53,300

== End of The Big Game ==
A key feature of The Big Game had been the NAPT passport awarded to the season champion Loose Cannon. The NAPT passport, valued at $50,000, consisted of entry fees and expenses for various NAPT tournaments.

On April 15, 2011, along with similar competitors' sites, Pokerstars.com was seized and shut down by U.S. Attorney's Office for the Southern District of New York, which alleged it was in violation of federal bank fraud and money laundering laws. The company subsequently stopped allowing players from the United States to play real money games.

The NAPT immediately ceased operation, eliminating the main prize for The Big Game's loose cannon. The second season had been filmed prior to the charges against Pokerstars, so this final season was able to run in the months after dismantling of the NAPT.

On May 11, 2024, The Big Game returned as a YouTube show called "The Big Game On Tour".

== Season three ==
After a long hiatus, PokerStars brought back its hugely popular show as The Big Game on Tour. The third season began airing on May 10, 2024, with episodes available on PokerStars’ YouTube channel starting on May 11, 2024. Joe Stapleton and James Hartigan commentated and both loose cannons were mentored by Season 1 loose cannon Nadya Magnus.

The rules remained largely the same, though the loose cannons were now staked $50,000 instead of $100,000 (with the blinds now $100/$200). Any profit over $50,000 could be kept by the loose cannon.

The first set of five episodes featured players like Phil Hellmuth, Lex Veldhuis, Alan Keating and Jennifer Tilly. The second set, aired later in the summer, had a fresh lineup including players like Phil Laak, Sam Grafton and Maria Ho.

Season three was split into two parts:

- Part 1 featured loose cannon Nikki Limo, who was busted by Jennifer Tilly on the final day, while Arden Cho topped the leaderboard with a profit of $246,600.

- Part 2 featured loose cannon Lily Newhouse, who not only made a profit, but topped the leaderboard with $55,800.
