= National Heads-Up Poker Championship =

- Created by: NBC Sports
- Presented by: Shana Hiatt (2007), Leeann Tweeden (2008-2011), Julie Donaldson (2013), Jeff Platt (2025), Natalie Bode (2026)
- Narrated by: Gabe Kaplan (2005-06), Matt Vasgersian (2005-08, 2013), Ali Nejad (2007-present), Craig Hummer (2009-11), Joe Stapleton (2025), Brent Hanks (2026)
- Country of origin: United States
- No. of seasons: 10
- No. of episodes: 107

Production
- Production locations: Golden Nugget Las Vegas (2005), Caesars Palace (2006 - 2013), PokerGO Studio at Aria Resort and Casino (2025-present)
- Running time: 60 minutes (including commercials)

Original release
- Network: NBC
- Release: 2005
- Network: PokerGO and Peacock
- Release: December 4, 2025 – present

The National Heads-Up Poker Championship was an annual poker tournament held in the United States and produced by the NBC television network. It is a $25,000 "buy-in" invitation-only tournament organized as a series of one-on-one games of no limit Texas hold 'em matches. The participants include many of the world's most successful poker players, as well as celebrities.

The championship was the first poker event to be televised on and produced by a major U.S. television network.

In October 2011, NBC announced that the National Heads-Up Poker Championship would not return in 2012, ending the championship's seven-year run. After a one-year hiatus, the tournament returned for a final time in 2013. The $25,000 buy-in event ran from Jan 24 through 26 at Caesars Palace, the same venue where the event was held from 2006 through 2011.

In February 2014, NBC announced the National Heads-Up Poker Championship would not return in 2014.

In July 2025, PokerGO and PokerStars announced that NHUPC will return after 12 years. The tournament features a $25,000 buy-in and will premiere on Peacock later in the year before streaming on the PokerGO platform. Mori Eskandani, President of PokerGO, is a famous TV poker producer responsible for shows such as Poker After Dark and High Stakes Poker, as well as the National Heads-Up Poker Championship said:

“The National Heads-Up Poker Championship helped define the golden era of televised poker. We’re proud to partner with PokerStars to bring back a truly iconic brand and share it with a new generation of fans.”

The Heads-Up Championship had been sponsored by online poker companies before Black Friday. The World Series of Poker (WSOP.com) was the 2013 presenting sponsor. PokerStars would be the presenting sponsor for 2025.

== Structure ==
The single-elimination tournament is modeled after college basketball tournaments. Players who win a match advance to the next round; the player who wins six matches is crowned champion.

The first round is seeded randomly the night before the tournament begins. Players are divided into four brackets – Clubs, Diamonds, Hearts, and Spades. A participant advances by winning a heads-up match against his or her randomly drawn opponent. The structure of the brackets then determines every match thereafter. The semifinals consist of one player from each bracket, with the winner of the Spades bracket playing the winner of the Clubs bracket, and the winner of the Hearts bracket matched up against the winner of the Diamonds bracket. A best-of-three final match then determines which of the two finalists is crowned champion.

== Brief history ==
The National Heads-Up Poker Championship is an invitation-only event. In contrast, the World Heads-Up Poker Championship is an open event with a maximum participation of 128 players.

The 2005 event took place at the Golden Nugget Las Vegas between March 4 and 6. It aired weekly on NBC from May 1 to 22 with commentary from Gabe Kaplan and Matt Vasgersian.

The 2006 edition took place from March 4 to 6 at Caesars Palace in Las Vegas. NBC began its coverage by broadcasting one part of the opening round on April 16. The semi-final and championship matches aired May 21. Kaplan and Vasgersian returned as commentators.

The 2007 edition was broadcast from April 8 to May 20. Ali Nejad took Gabe Kaplan's spot as commentator due to Kaplan competing in the tournament.

The 2025 edition was filmed in August 2025 at the PokerGO Studio at Aria Resort and Casino in Las Vegas. The show premiered on Peacock from December 4 to 18, 2025. Ali Nejad returned to the commentary booth alongside PokerStars' Joe Stapleton, while Jeff Platt was on sideline duties. It began airing on PokerGO on February 2, 2026.

The 2026 edition was filmed in May 2026 at the PokerGO Studio at Aria Resort and Casino in Las Vegas. The show premiered on Peacock from August 21 to 28, 2026. Ali Nejad continued in the commentary booth but was joined by Brent Hanks, while Natalie Bode stepped into the sideline reporter role for Jeff Platt who was a participant in the tournament.

== Results ==
Year	Winner	Runner-up	Best-of-three final score
2005	(United States) Phil Hellmuth	(United States) Chris Ferguson	2–1
2006	(United States) Ted Forrest	(United States) Chris Ferguson	2–1
2007	(United States) Paul Wasicka	(United States) Chad Brown	2–0
2008	(United States) Chris Ferguson	(United States) Andy Bloch	2–1
2009	(United States) Huck Seed	(United States) Vanessa Rousso	2–0
2010	(United States) Annie Duke	(United States) Erik Seidel	2–1
2011	(United States) Erik Seidel	(United States) Chris Moneymaker	2–0
2012	no tournament		
2013	(United States) Mike Matusow	(United States) Phil Hellmuth	2–1
2025	(United States) Sam Soverel	(United States) Keith Lehr	2–1
2026			

== See also ==
- Poker After Dark
- High Stakes Poker
- No Gamble, No Future
- PokerGO
- World Series of Poker
