= Jeff Platt =

American sports commentator (born 1986)

- Born: June 4, 1986 (age 39); Dallas, Texas, United States
- Occupation: Sports commentator
- Known for: Coverage of World Series of Poker
- Style: Host / play-by-play
- Television: ESPN and PokerGO

Jeffrey Platt (born June 4, 1986) is an American sports commentator and professional poker player known for his work on the PokerGO break desk and as a sideline reporter for tournaments including the World Series of Poker, Poker Masters, and U.S. Poker Open. He is the host of several shows and podcasts for PokerGO and PokerNews, including No Gamble, No Future.

== Early life and education ==
Platt was born in Dallas, Texas, and attended Plano West High School. Platt attended the University of Southern California and graduated with a degree in broadcast journalism.

== Career ==
Platt worked as a sports anchor and reporter at CBS affiliate WJTV in Jackson, Mississippi, after graduation before returning to Dallas, Texas, to work for ESPN covering the Dallas Mavericks. Platt then joined Spectrum News San Antonio covering the San Antonio Spurs before finding his way into poker through his connections with Poker PROductions in 2018 which included working as a PokerNews reporter and hosting the PokerNews Podcast.

In September 2018, a partnership between Facebook Watch, Stadium, and PokerGO launched Friday Night Poker, with Platt and Brent Hanks providing play-by-play commentary, while Amanda Leatherman provided updates from the floor. The 13-week season featured the $5/$10 No-Limit Hold’em cash game with a changing mix of players that included Daniel Negreanu, Antonio Esfandiari, Mike Matusow, Jennifer Harman, Bryn Kenney, Frank Kassela, Jennifer Tilly, Chris Moorman, Randall Emmett, Eli Elezra, and Phil Hellmuth.

In November 2019, Platt debuted his first show on PokerGO. The Big Blind was a blend of trivia and poker strategy with Platt hosting three contestants who answered poker-related questions but in a format following a limit hold’em betting structure. Guests included Chris Moneymaker, Norm Macdonald, Mike Matusow, Norman Chad, Alex Jacob, Ben Yu, Matt Berkey, Prahlad Friedman, and Scott Vener. The winner of Season 1 was Chad who won $15,000 in prize money.

In March 2020, PokerGO announced that Platt would host The Championship Run that would review key hands from notable tournament victories. The Championship Run covered wins from the World Series of Poker, Super High Roller Bowl, Poker Masters, and U.S. Poker Open.

In January 2021, Platt began co-hosting No Gamble, No Future with Brent Hanks. The show airs live on Tuesdays across PokerGO’s YouTube, Facebook, and Twitch channels. Guests so far have included Nick Schulman, Phil Hellmuth, Daniel Negreanu, and Antonio Esfandiari.

In July 2022, No Gamble, No Future was announced as PokerGO's newest show that would provide cash game-focused entertainment. The show would be filmed at the PokerGO Studio with Platt and Hanks hosting. The season would run for 20 episodes on Tuesday evenings on PokerGO.

The National Heads-Up Poker Championship returned in 2025 on PokerGO, and Platt was announced as the sideline host. Previous sideline hosts include Shana Hiatt, Leeann Tweeden, and Julie Donaldson.

== Poker career ==
Platt began playing poker in 2008, and at the 2014 World Series of Poker he had a 203rd-place finish in the Main Event for $44,728. At the 2015 World Series of Poker, Platt finished 60th in the Main Event for $113,764.

In August 2019, Platt made his Poker After Dark debut during Season 10 on Open Seat week playing $25/$50 No-Limit Hold’em. In October 2019, Platt appeared on Showbound! week where he played in a $5,000 buy-in sit-n-go and finished in seventh-place.

In October 2021, Platt finished in fourth-place in Event #43: $1,000 No-Limit Hold'em Double Stack at the 2021 World Series of Poker for $160,662.

In September 2022, Platt won the $1,100 No-Limit Hold'em MSPT Venetian for $100,804.

In October 2022, Platt won his first WSOP-Circuit Online ring in the $215 No-Limit Hold'em 6-Max for $18,689.

As of January 2026, his live tournament winnings exceed $888,000.

== Personal life ==
Platt currently lives in Las Vegas, Nevada, and is a fan of the NBA and the Dallas Mavericks.
