= Joe Stapleton (poker) =

American poker commentator

- Born: October 6, 1982 (age 43); New York, New York, United States
- Occupation: Poker commentator
- Known for: Coverage of World Series of Poker and PokerStars events
- Style: Host / play-by-play

Joe Stapleton is an American poker commentator. He has been an active commentator since 2009, working for PokerStars on the European Poker Tour until 2026. He joined the World Series of Poker commentary team in the same year.

== Commentator ==
Joe Stapleton worked for PokerStars until 2026, commentating both live and online events—especially during COVID-19, including events such as SCOOP—with the likes of Maria Ho and Joe Ingram.

The National Heads-Up Poker Championship returned to PokerGO in 2025 and Stapleton was announced as a co-commentator alongside Ali Nejad.

== Comedy ==
In a May 2021 interview, Joe Stapleton mentioned the fact that he had a voice problem during the summer of 2020, preventing him for doing any comedy bits. He had to undergo surgery to fix this in February 2021.

== Awards ==
Along with fellow poker commentator James Hartigan, Stapleton was the recipient of the, 'Best Podcast' award at the 2022 Global Poker Awards, for their show "Poker in the Ears".
