= Patrik Antonius =

Finnish poker player (born 1980)

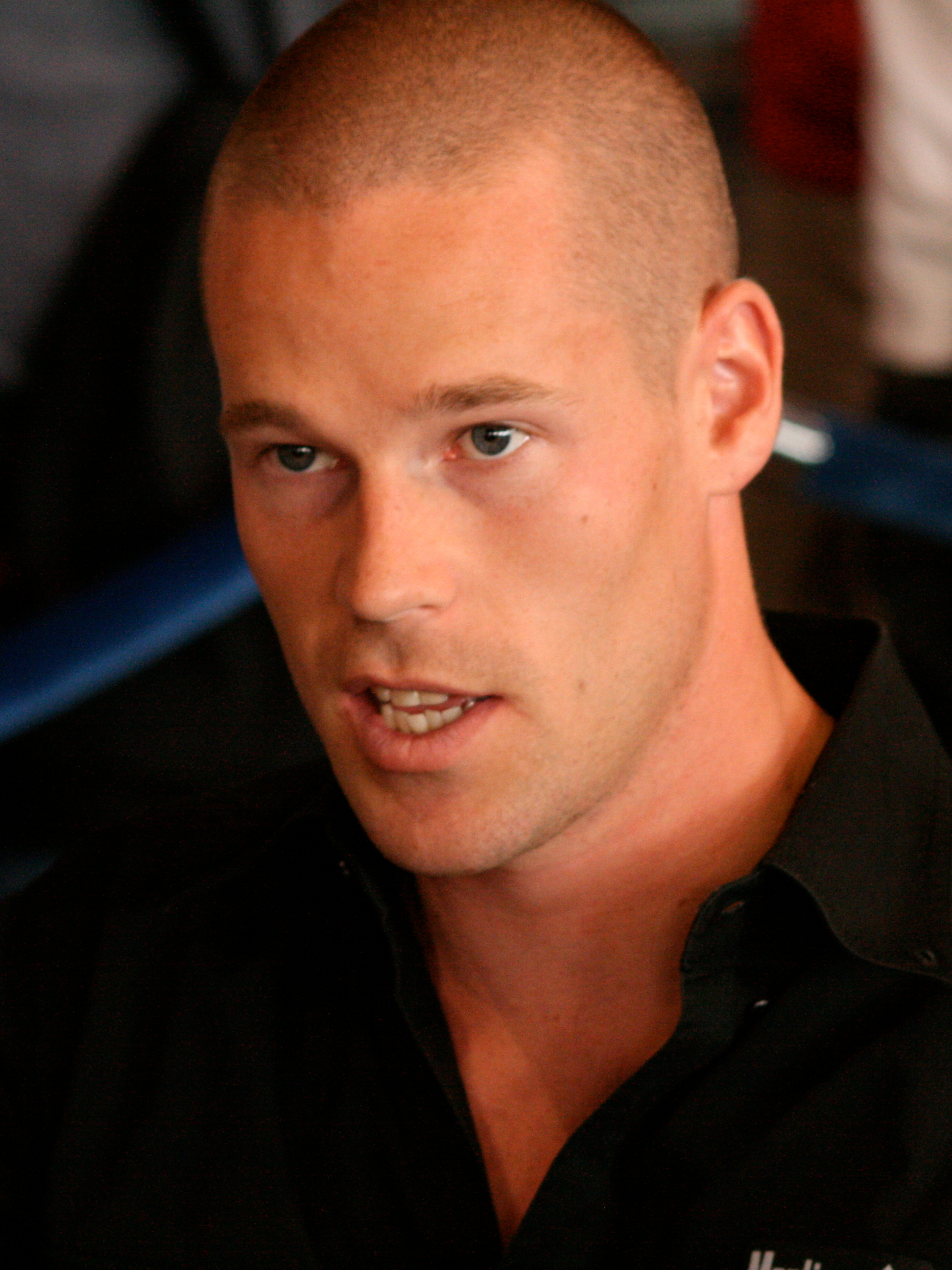
- Antonius in 2008
- Nicknames: PA, Black Lotus, The Finn
- Born: 13 December 1980 (age 45); Helsinki, Finland

World Series of Poker
- Bracelet: None
- Final tables: 3
- Money finishes: 27
- Highest WSOP Main Event finish: 587th, 2023

World Poker Tour
- Title: None
- Final table: 1
- Money finishes: 7

European Poker Tour
- Title: 1
- Final tables: 3
- Money finishes: 9

Patrik Antonius (born 13 December 1980) is a Finnish professional poker player. He is also a former tennis player and coach, and model. He has resided in Monte Carlo since 2008. Antonius was mentored by poker pro Marcel Lüske as a member of Luske's "Circle of Outlaws" and later advised by Jennifer Harman. In 2024, Antonius was inducted into the Poker Hall of Fame. As of 2024, his total live tournament winnings exceed $29,300,000.

== Poker career ==
Antonius began, as a 25-year old, making a name for himself on the poker tournament circuit with two finishes near the final table of a European Poker Tour (EPT) event and a World Poker Tour (WPT) event, 12th at the EPT PokerStars Caribbean Adventure, then 15th at the WPT Bay 101 Shooting Stars event two months later, in early 2005. He went on to finish in the money in three events of the 2005 World Series of Poker (WSOP). In September 2005 he made the EPT Main Event final table, finishing 3rd in Barcelona. The next month, Antonius won the EPT event in Baden bei Wien, taking home the €288,180 first prize when in the final hand his 8♠ 4♥ beat Gunnar Østebrød's Q♥ 9♣ on a board of 4♠ 7♠ 8♥ 3♣ 7♣. In December 2005 he finished the year 2nd in the WPT Five Diamond World Poker Classic in Las Vegas, Nevada, winning $1,046,470.

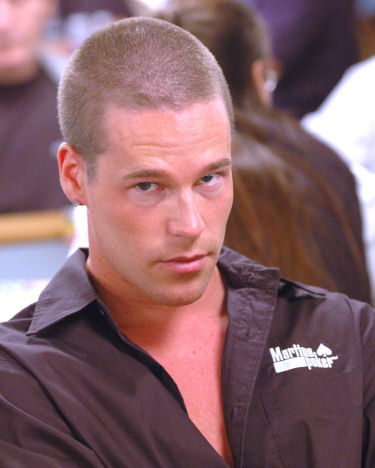
Antonius at the 2006 World Series of Poker

In July 2006 he placed 9th in the 143-player 8-handed World Series of Poker $50,000 H.O.R.S.E. event, taking home $205,920, his biggest cash that year. In the 2007 World Series of Poker, Antonius entered numerous tournaments but he only cashed in the World Championship of Pot Limit Omaha event, placing third and winning $311,394, making that his ninth WSOP cash and increasing his WSOP earnings to a total of $569,964. Antonius has been featured three times on NBC's Poker After Dark. In his first appearance, he finished as runner up, losing out to fellow poker professional Jennifer Harman, but his next attempt saw him defeat Brad Booth in heads-up play to take the victory. In his third appearance he was runner up again, this time to Johnny Chan.

Antonius was not able to enter the 2009 WSOP Main Event, as he was turned away when attempting to register along with hundreds of others due to a capacity field.

He also plays in some of the highest profile online tournaments, and in September 2008, he finished 2nd in the Full Tilt Poker $25,000 buy-in Heads-Up Pot Limit Omaha Championship, winning $320,000.

Antonius finished 9th in the 593-player 8-handed €10,400 2011 World Series of Poker Europe main event for a prize of €90,000. In January 2013, Antonius finished third in the Aussie Millions Main event for $600,000.

In March 2018, Antonius earned his largest live cash with a runner-up finish in the Super High Roller Bowl in Macau. He earned $3,153,551.

In September 2022, Antonius won the Triton Poker $25,000 No-Limit Hold'em event for $825,000.

In April 2024, Antonius won the €100,000 Super High Roller title at the PokerStars EPT in Monte Carlo, earning €1,967,440 after a heads-up victory against Christoph Vogelsang. In July 2024, he was inducted into the Poker Hall of Fame. In November 2024, Antonius claimed the $200,000 NLH Invitational title at the Triton Poker Series in Monte Carlo, winning $5,130,000 following a heads-up match against Vladimir Korzinin.

=== Prize Money (Tournaments) ===
Year	Prize money (in $)	Victories
2003	3480	–
2004	720	–
2005	1,696,483	2
2006	368,455	–
2007	614,301	1
2008	148,381	–
2009	29,207	2
2010	234,079	2
2011	289,764	–
2012	1,945,241	–
2013	810,889	–
2014	626,937	–
2015	20,853	–
2016	0	–
2017	10,390	–
2018	5,022,013	1
2019	192,072	1
2020	0	–
2021	0	–
2022	1,777,581	1
Total	13,790,845	10

== Cash games ==
Antonius is a heads-up specialist. He is a regular high-stakes player online and one of the most successful, having won millions of dollars. He has played on Full Tilt Poker under several nicknames, including Luigi66369, CryMeRiver9 and Finddagrind, but having become a member of "Team Full Tilt" he now plays under his real name. During his early career he also used screen names e.g. I_knockout_U, try_hrdr_fish and -ANTONIUS- on various other poker networks. Previously Antonius was one of a team of players associated with Martinspoker.com.

He is equally prolific in live cash games, and is a regular in the Big Game, the high-stakes cash game at the Bellagio. Antonius appeared on the third to sixth seasons of GSN's High Stakes Poker. Patrik was involved, along with Sammy Farha, in the show's largest ever pot; it totaled $998,800. After a preflop raise and re-raise the flop came 6♦ 3♣ 9♦; Antonius held J♥ 9♥ for top pair and Farha held K♦ Q♦, giving him two over-cards and a flush draw. Sammy called Patrik's all-in raise instantly and the two agreed to run the turn and river four times. Though Sammy's hand was a slight favorite, Patrik won three of the four runs and collected $749,100.

In another sizable pot on High Stakes Poker, Patrik went up against Jamie Gold. Jamie had K♠ K♦ versus Patrik's A♠ J♦. Patrik raised to $4,000 preflop with Jamie reraising to $14,000, after declaring that his hole cards felt "like aces". The flop came out 3♠ Q♦ 10♥, giving Patrik an inside straight draw. Jamie bet $15,000 into a $30,800 pot, which Patrik called. The turn was the K♥, giving Patrik a straight and Jamie a set of kings. Patrik bet $45,000 into the pot, which Jamie raised all in. Patrik immediately called making the pot worth $743,800. The players agreed to run the river three times. Despite being a 77%-23% favorite, Patrik won only the last of the three times, as Jamie hit a full house on the first two. At the time, it was the largest pot ever on High Stakes Poker.

Antonius has since lost a pot of almost $600,000 to Tom Dwan on an episode of the Poker After Dark high-stakes cash game. Tom straddled the hand to $1,200 and Patrik was first to act having pocket 10s, with which he raised. Tom reraised the hand with pocket kings and Patrik called. The flop gave Patrik a set of tens and he bet $27,000, which Tom called. The turn was a king, giving Tom a set of kings. Patrik bet $59,000 which led to Dwan going all-in for over $200,000. Patrik called, making the pot almost $600,000. They ran it twice, with Patrik losing both. The hand had the largest pot in the history of Poker After Dark.

In November 2009, Antonius won the biggest pot in online poker history, $1,356,946 against Viktor Blom, who was at the time known only by his Full Tilt Poker moniker, Isildur1.

In February 2023, Antonius played on PokerGO's No Gamble, No Future cash game show. In No Gamble, No Future's Cash of the Titans that was shot over three days, Antonius would win the biggest pot in U.S. poker stream history when he doubled up through Eric Persson in a pot totalling $1,978,000. With the stakes at $1,000 / $2,000 blinds and a $2,000 big blind ante, Persson raised to $7,000 in the cutoff with Q♥ 9♥ and Rob Yong called on the button with A♣ 2♣. Antonius three-bet the small blind to $30,000 with A♥ K♥. Persson and Yong called as the flop landed 3♥ 3♣ 8♥. Antonius bet out $40,000 and Persson raised to $140,000. Yong folded, but Antonius made it $250,000 and Persson called. The turn landed the A♠ and Antonius bet $150,000. Persson moved all-in and Antonius called all-in for just over $520,000. The river landed the J♠ and Antonius won the biggest pot in U.S. poker stream history.

== Personal life ==
Antonius was born in Helsinki, grew up in Hakunila, Vantaa, and he lived in Las Vegas, U.S., before he moved to Monte Carlo, Monaco, in 2008. He has two children with his wife, American professional poker player Maya Geller, whom he met in 2008.
