= Eric Persson (poker player) =

American poker player (born 1975)

- Born: Eric Hans Persson; 1975 (age 50–51); Hoquiam, Washington, U.S.
- Education: University of Nevada, Las Vegas (BA); Georgetown University Law Center (JD)
- Occupation: Businessman
- Spouse: Ann (m. 2007)
- Children: 4

Eric Persson is an American businessman and co-founder and CEO of Maverick Gaming. Persson is also known for participating in a cash game poker match that yielded one of the largest pots in American televised poker history, $1,978,000, and for owning/operating the Maverick Gaming casinos in Nevada, Colorado, and Washington.

== Early life ==
Persson was born and raised in Hoquiam, WA, near the Shoalwater Bay Indian Nation tribe that he is a member of. In 1st grade, he knew he wanted to be involved in gaming when he grew up.

He attended the University of Nevada, Las Vegas, to study sociology, criminal justice, psychology, political science and government, and communications, earning a Bachelor of Arts degree in 1998. He then attended the Georgetown University Law Center, earning his Juris Doctor degree in 2001. Persson claims to have put himself through undergraduate and professional schooling with earnings from playing poker.

== Business ventures ==
After graduating from law school, Persson began his career in gaming at a casino in Topeka, KS, progressively working his way into senior roles at a casino in Wheeling, WV, and ultimately in Las Vegas.

Prior to starting Maverick Gaming LLC., Persson was a senior vice president at Las Vegas Sands Corporation, and president and COO of Aruze Gaming. He gives credit to the five billionaires he has worked with for teaching him lessons he has used for success: Sheldon Adelson, Michael Gaughan, Kazuo Okada, Jeremy Jacobs, and Jeffrey Gural. “All of these men are driven, have the ability to imagine the reality they want, and then make that imagination real. None of them stood on the sidelines of life and watched it pass by. I won’t either”, Persson said in a 2019 interview.

In December 2017, Persson and business partner Justin Beltram started Maverick Gaming with their first casino purchases: the Red Garter Hotel and Casino, and the Wendover Nugget Hotel and Casino, both in West Wendover, NV. The reported investment was $43 million. Maverick has continued to acquire small to medium-size casinos ($2-$30 million EBITDA range), most recently (December 2022 ) paying $80.5 million for 4 card rooms in Washington State, bringing the total as of April 2023 to 31 gaming properties in Nevada, Colorado, and Washington.

Persson has said that he will keep Maverick Gaming as a privately held company, and eventually pass it along to his son.

In July of 2025, with 1,200 hotel rooms, nearly 1,700 slot machines and 43 table games in Nevada, as well as three casinos in Colorado; Maverick Gaming LLC filed for Chapter 11 bankruptcy in Texas and listed total liabilities and assets in the range of $100 million to $500 million, according to court papers, then announced closure of four of its card rooms in the Seattle area.

=== Sports betting lawsuit ===
In January 2022, Maverick filed a lawsuit against state and federal authorities to break what it claims is a monopoly on sports betting by tribal interests. In Washington state, where Maverick operates many game rooms, Native American lands were given exclusive rights for sports betting following the Supreme Court ruling in 2018 that struck down the federal ban on sports betting.

Maverick is suing on the grounds that Washington's implementation of IGRA creates a monopoly and also violates the Constitution's equal protection clause because it is racial discrimination. Persson's own tribe, the Shoalwater Bay Indian Nation, though not named in Maverick's lawsuit, filed a brief to have the case dismissed. In February 2023, US District Judge David Estudillo agreed with the tribes, writing, “As the Tribes note, such relief threatens not only tribal revenue and contracts, but also tribal and non-tribal employment and other businesses, which Shoalwater asserts is a matter of sovereign authority.”

Immediately following the ruling, Maverick appealed the ruling. Persson stated his intent to appeal all the way to the Supreme Court, if needed, adding that he has the resources to do so. Maverick's appeal is on the docket of the U.S. Court of Appeals, Ninth Circuit, with final briefs due in July 2023. A Supreme Court ruling on the case could reach far beyond Washington state, including Florida, where there is a similar sports betting law that favors the Seminole Tribe.

== Poker ==
Persson has played poker in his spare time since he was in college, specializing in cash games rather than tournament-style poker. In recent years, he has actively sought to participate in televised poker matches and social media to build his Maverick Gaming brand, claiming it could boost his company's value from 6–8 times revenue to 8–10 times revenue. Persson has said the brand-building process on social media has given the false impression that he is always playing poker when, in fact, he only plays a few times per month.

On February 22, 2023, Persson participated in a match that resulted in the largest pot in U.S. televised poker history. The PokerGO No Gamble, No Future cash game featured Persson and Patrik Antonius, who took the record $1,780,000 pot, surpassing the previous record of $1,158,000 on Hustler Casino Live. Persson has appeared in all four seasons of No Gamble, No Future.

Persson has played since Season 9 of High Stakes Poker Persson also played on Season 11, including the first-ever High Stakes Poker livestream.

In May 2023, Persson played Daniel Negreanu in Round 1 of High Stakes Duel 4. Negreanu defeated Persson to claim the $100,000 prize pool, and Persson opted out of the Round 2 rematch.

== Personal life ==
Persson is married and has four children. He and his wife and sons live in the Las Vegas area. He has two daughters from an earlier marriage.
