= Brent Hanks =

American sports commentator and professional poker player

- Born: Fillmore, New York, United States
- Occupations: Sports commentator PokerGO Director of Programming
- Known for: Coverage of PokerGO tournaments
- Style: Host / analyst
- Television: PokerGO

Brent Hanks is an American sports commentator and professional poker player mostly known as being a member of the PokerGO break desk. He is also the co-host with Jeff Platt of the No Gamble, No Future video podcast on PokerGO that evolved into a cash game-focused entertainment show in July 2022.

== Early life and education ==
Hanks was born in Fillmore, New York, and attended St. Bonaventure University where he obtained a Master's Degree in Elementary Literacy in 2007. After graduation, Hanks was a fifth-grade math and social studies teacher before becoming a professional poker player.

== Career ==
Hanks is the Director of Programming for PokerGO and is tasked with putting together lineups for popular shows such as High Stakes Poker and Poker After Dark. As part of the PokerGO team, Hanks is also one of the co-hosts alongside Jeff Platt on the No Gamble, No Future video podcast.

During PokerGO's coverage of tournament series such as Poker Masters, U.S. Poker Open, PokerGO Cup, and Super High Roller Bowl, Hanks serves as one of the break desk members alongside Platt and Maria Ho.

In July 2022, No Gamble, No Future was announced as PokerGO's newest show that would provide cash game-focused entertainment. The show would be filmed at the PokerGO Studio with Hanks and Platt hosting. Season 1 is expected to begin airing in August.

== Poker career ==
Hanks began playing poker while attending St. Bonaventure University and registered his first tournament result in 2006. After leaving teaching behind and travelling to Las Vegas, Hanks won his first WSOP gold bracelet at the 2012 World Series of Poker in Event #2: $1,500 No-Limit Hold'em when he topped the 2,101-player field to win the $517,725 first-place prize.

In May 2013, Hanks won the 2013 California State Poker Championship after defeating a 258-player field to win the $117,760 first-place prize.

At the WSOP, Hanks has cashed 38 times following the 2022 World Series of Poker which includes a total of three WSOP Main Event cashes.

As of July 2022, his live tournament winnings exceed $1,850,000.

== Personal life ==
Hanks met his wife Liz in Western New York, and were married at the Red Rock Country Club in 2013. Hanks currently lives in Las Vegas, Nevada, with his wife Liz. Hanks is also an avid Buffalo Bills fan.
