= Heartland Poker Tour =

- Logo
- Country of origin: United States
- No. of seasons: 9
- No. of episodes: 230

Production
- Production location: North Dakota
- Running time: 43 minutes

Original release
- Release: June 26, 2005 – present

Heartland Poker Tour (HPT) is an internationally syndicated television program airing 52 weeks each year and a U.S.-based poker tour. Created by friends Greg Lang and Todd Anderson in 2005, HPT promotes the tagline "Real People, Unreal Money." Originally developed to be a regional TV show airing in the Midwest, syndication expanded as the appetite for televised poker grew. HPT now airs weekly on hundreds of stations across the United States, Europe, the Caribbean, and the Middle East. DirecTV and DISH Network carry the program on multiple stations in the U.S.

== Synopsis ==
By the end of their sixth season in 2010, HPT produced over 150 hour-long episodes. Two one-hour episodes are filmed at each stop on the U.S. tour in casinos located in states such as Colorado, Nevada, Minnesota, Iowa, Oklahoma, Indiana, and Michigan. Commentators Fred Bevill and Chris Hanson analyzed play of the final six contestants in the Main Event for the episodes during Seasons 1 through 8. Starting in Season 9, Maria Ho replaced Chris Hanson and the final table format was increased to nine players, up from six. To enter the main event, poker enthusiasts either buy directly in or win their way through the qualifying system for a fraction of the investment of the widely celebrated World Series of Poker, which commands buy ins up to $50,000. HPT's main event is typically a $1650 buy in, although it can vary by venue. Prize money is awarded to the top 10% of the field or 30 places, whichever is greater. HPT tournaments follow rules established by the Tournament Directors Association for Texas hold 'em poker.

== History ==
In January 2009, HPT announced a relationship with the nonprofit group Disabled American Veterans (DAV) to raise funds and awareness for the cause. One percent of every prize pool goes to support DAV programs, where applicable under state gaming laws. HPT also coordinates celebrity charity poker tournaments to raise additional funds. DAV Public Service Announcements (PSAs) air in HPT episodes weekly.

In January 2010, HPT made headlines in the poker community when the company chartered four private jets to fly two hundred poker enthusiasts to Las Vegas, Nevada, for the Season VI launch of the tour. The event attracted celebrities like actor Lou Diamond Phillips and poker pro Dennis Phillips and sold out Red Rock Casino Resort Spa.

In March 2010, HPT signed 2009 WSOP runner up Darvin Moon to represent the brand as Tour Ambassador. Moon became a fan favorite among HPT's tour regulars when he declined an invitation for the November Nine taping in 2010 to play an HPT stop in Iowa. A last minute replacement for an ill Scotty Nguyen, Moon bonded with HPT’s crew and players.

== See also ==
- Poker on television
