= Mori Eskandani =

American television producer (born 1956)

- Born: January 29, 1956 (age 70)

World Series of Poker
- Bracelet: None
- Money finishes: 16
- Highest WSOP Main Event finish: 15th, 1993

World Poker Tour
- Title: None
- Final table: None
- Money finish: 1

Mori Eskandani (born January 29, 1956) is an Iranian-American producer of many American television poker programs such as Poker After Dark, High Stakes Poker, and the National Heads-Up Poker Championship. Eskandani is a veteran cash game poker player who has amassed several live tournament winnings as well. Mori began his gambling career in the Portland, Oregon area playing card rooms and moved to Las Vegas in the mid 1980s. Mori's first foray into television was in collaboration with Henry Orenstein on Poker Superstars in 2004 as Co-Creator, Tournament Director and Consultant. Since then Mori's Production Company, PokerPROductions, has gone on to produce Poker After Dark, High Stakes Poker, National Heads-Up Poker Championship, Face the Ace, and more. As of 2009, Poker PROductions started producing WSOP Europe and in 2011, the World Series of Poker.

Eskandani was inducted into the Poker Hall of Fame in 2018.
