= Norman Chad =

American sportswriter, syndicated columnist, and commentator

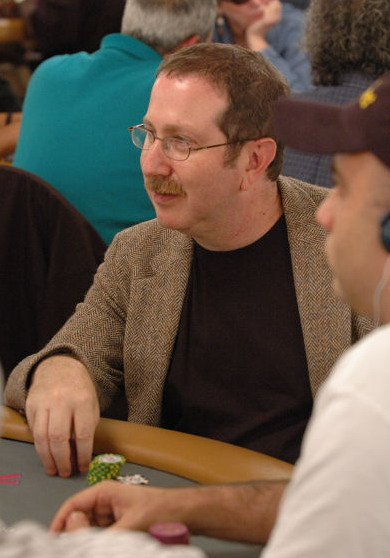
- Chad at the 2006 World Series of Poker
- Born: 1958 (age 67–68)
- Education: University of Maryland, College Park
- Occupations: Sportswriter; television commentator
- Website: normanchad.com

Norman Chad (born 1958) is an American sportswriter and television poker commentator.

== Biography ==
Chad grew up in Silver Spring, Maryland, the son of Seymour and Cuban-born Perla Chad. Chad attended Northwood High School before graduating from the University of Maryland, College Park in 1981.

Since 2003, Chad has appeared on most of ESPN's poker broadcasts, including the World Series of Poker and The United States Poker Championship, among other events. For 12 years, Chad made NFL predictions against the spread in his syndicated column; Chad picked the winners merely by flipping a coin, and most years ended up with a winning record.

Chad married his college girlfriend in 1984; the marriage ended in divorce. He was married to his second wife for less than a year. In 2007, Chad married his third wife, Toni.
