= Shana Hiatt =

American model and presenter (born 1975)

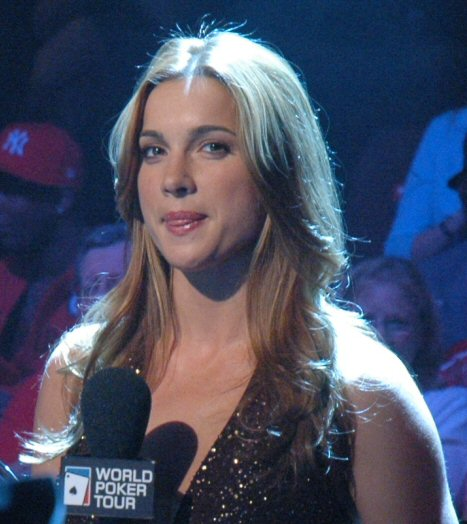
- Hiatt hosting the World Poker Tour in 2005
- Born: December 17, 1975 (age 50)
- Occupations: Model, presenter, poker player
- Spouse(s): Tommy Gunn (divorced) James Van Patten (m. 1999; div. 2005) Todd Garner (m. 2005)
- Children: 1

Shana Hiatt (born December 17, 1975) is an American model and presenter who has appeared in several magazines.

== Personal life ==
A former Army brat raised primarily in Tabernacle Township, New Jersey, Hiatt is best known for hosting the first three seasons of World Poker Tour on The Travel Channel.

She was married to pornographic actor Tommy Gunn for three years in the 1990s.

== Poker ==
While Hiatt was a non-player prior to her job with the World Poker Tour, she is now an avid online poker player who occasionally plays in casinos. She was the host of Poker After Dark and the National Heads-Up Poker Championship, both on NBC. Hiatt left the shows in 2008 due to pregnancy. She was replaced by Marianela Pereyra in Poker After Dark and by Leeann Tweeden in the National Heads-Up Poker Championship.

After leaving the World Poker Tour in 2005, Hiatt sued the producers in order to get a restraining order to prevent them from keeping her from working on a rival poker show on NBC, Poker After Dark. The WPT argued a non-compete clause was part of her contract, but Hiatt countered that she never signed it. The suit additionally revealed Hiatt left the WPT over a "hostile working environment" involving her husband, movie producer Todd Garner, whom she married in October 2005. Hiatt was formerly married to James Van Patten, brother of World Poker Tour co-host Vince Van Patten.

== Modeling ==
Hiatt was Miss Hawaiian Tropic USA in 1995 and had represented Beach Haven, New Jersey, after winning the local Hawaiian Tropic pageant at Touché nightclub in 1994. After becoming Miss Hawaiian Tropic USA, Hiatt was the cover model and posed nude inside the pages of Playboy in their April 1995 The Girls of Hawaiian Tropic issue. She also was on the cover for the video of that photo shoot Playboy: The Girls of Hawaiian Tropic, Naked in Paradise .

Hiatt was a guest host of Wild On! featured on the E! network. She has also appeared in television shows and movies including Must Love Dogs and Grandma's Boy.
