= Ali Nejad =

Iranian-American television personality (born 1978)

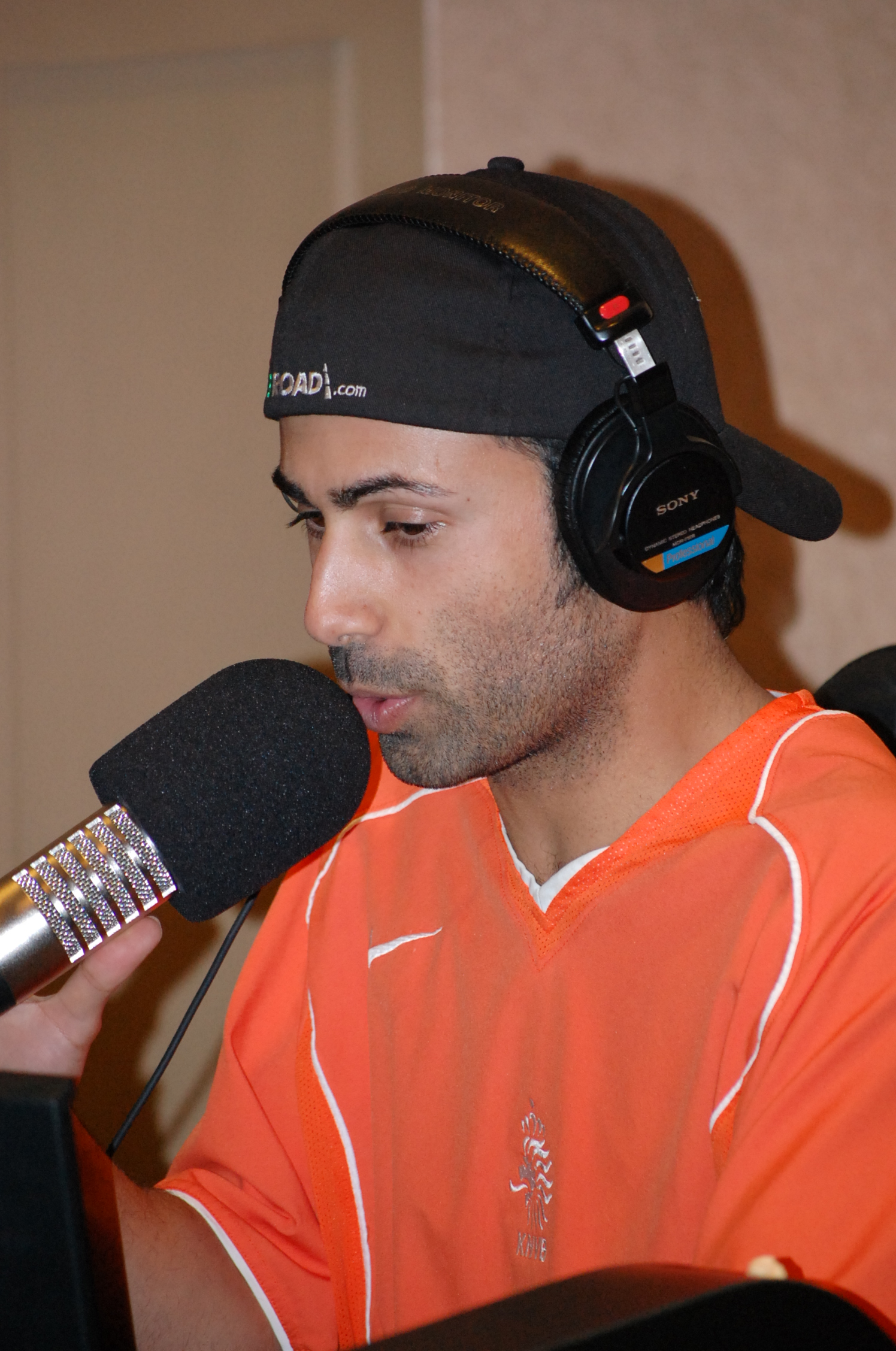
- Ali Nejad in 2008
- Born: 25 February 1978 (age 48)
- Occupation: Television presenter
- Known for: Coverage of World Series of Poker
- Style: Host / play-by-play
- Television: ESPN, Poker After Dark, and PokerGO

Oliver "Ali" Nejad (born 25 February 1978) is an Iranian-American television personality, who has hosted several shows including Road Trip on ESPNU, and has been a fill-in host for UNite, also on ESPNU. In May 2014, Nejad began working at HLN and hosted the network's program The Daily Share. He also executive produced and hosted his own award-nominated show, The Social Life.

Though he has worked on-air since age 17 on a variety of projects, he is also known for his work as a poker commentator. Nejad was the off-screen announcer on NBC's Poker After Dark and the color commentator on NBC's National Heads-Up Poker Championship. He has also been a correspondent for ESPN's World Series of Poker coverage, a commentator for ESPN's Pro-Am Poker Equalizer series, co-commentator with Chad Brown on the Ultimate Poker Challenge series and with Daniel Negreanu on the PCA 2009 series. In 2014, he hosted Alpha 8 for WPT.

Nejad has made three appearances as a player on commentators' week on Poker After Dark. In his first appearance, he finished sixth after Gabe Kaplan flopped a set of 10s to his set of 4s. In the second, he finished second to Mark Gregorich and in the third appearance he finished fifth, again being knocked out by Kaplan. He is a former "friend of Full Tilt Poker" and former co-host of the Poker Road Radio podcast on pokerroad.com.

Since Nejad was born in San Francisco, he is an American of Iranian descent, not an "Iranian American"

== Biography ==
From high school in Albany, California, through to college at UC Berkeley, Nejad hosted and reported for First Cut, a local NBC affiliate show in the San Francisco Bay area, where he began his television career. Having been a recreational poker player for years, Nejad dropped out of Berkeley in 1998 to pursue playing poker full-time. He worked as a dealer and prop player before eventually becoming a successful high limit cash game player. After 4 years playing poker, he returned to television in 2002, hosting an MTV pilot about video games that despite not getting picked up for a full season, marked his return to TV.

In 2003, aboard the PartyPoker Million cruise, he met Mori Eskandani, then the tournament director of Fox Sports Networks's Poker Superstars, and the future producer of the National Heads-Up Poker Championship and Poker After Dark. Eskandani hired Nejad as the master of ceremonies for the Poker Superstars event in 2004, which was the beginning of a long working relationship in televised poker.

On 7 February 2008 episode of Poker Road Radio, Joe Sebok announced that Nejad would be the new host of the Poker Road radio podcast. His tenure began on 26 February 2008 at the WPT Commerce event and ended right before the start of the 2009 WSOP.

GGPoker named Nejad as a brand ambassador.
