= Doug Polk =

American poker player (born 1988)

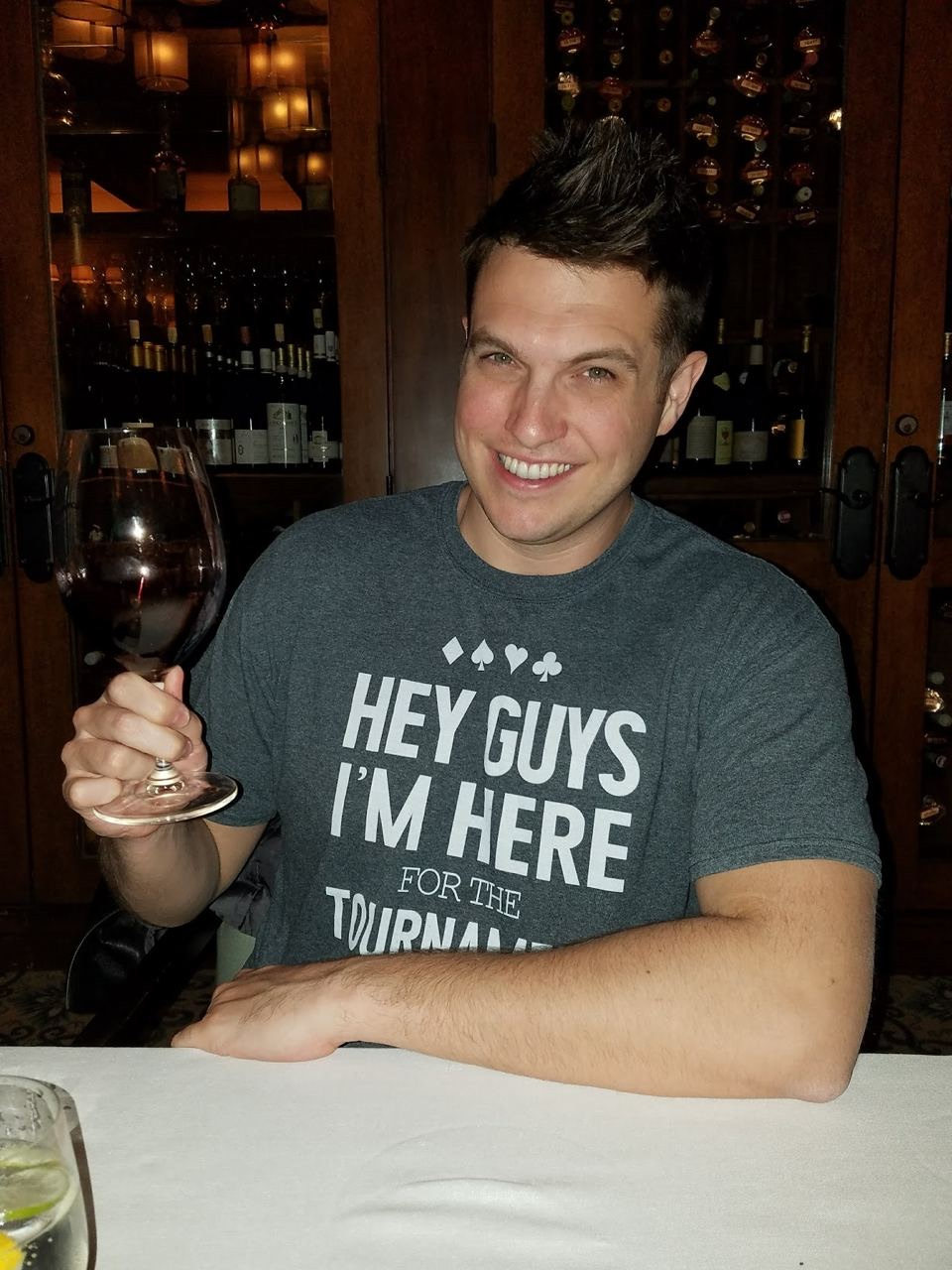
- Born: Douglas Kevin Polk; December 16, 1988 (age 37); Pasadena, California, U.S.

World Series of Poker
- Bracelets: 3
- Final tables: 5
- Money finishes: 11
- Highest WSOP Main Event finish: 592nd, 2011

European Poker Tour
- Money finish: 1

Douglas Kevin Polk (born December 16, 1988) is an American professional poker player. Polk played under the alias WCGRider, specializing in heads-up No Limit hold'em (HUNL).

== Early life ==
Polk was born in Pasadena, California, and has loved strategy games ever since he was five, when his father taught him chess. His family moved to Raleigh, North Carolina, during his childhood. At the age of 15, Polk competed in several World Cyber Games tournaments as a Warcraft 3 electronic sports player under the name T-Rider. In 2007, he graduated from Wakefield High School.

== Poker career ==
Polk attended the University of North Carolina Wilmington but dropped out to pursue poker full-time. He started playing $0.01/$0.02 stakes at PokerStars and ran a $20 deposit into $10,000. During this time, Polk described himself as a "breakeven rakeback pro".

In 2011, Polk was nearly broke and decided to fully focus on the game. By 2013, he was considered one of the best online cash game players in heads-up no limit hold'em. He played fellow professional poker player Ben "Sauce123" Sulsky in a highly publicized match of 15,000 hands. Polk walked away a $740,000 winner and received an additional $100,000 bonus for winning.

Polk was vocal about Daniel Negreanu's challenge of beating the $25/$50 stakes with two weeks of practice, criticizing him for underestimating his opponents. In mid-2015, Polk started the poker training site Upswing Poker with longtime friend and fellow poker professional Ryan Fee. Polk started a YouTube channel, Doug Polk Poker in 2016.

In 2015, Polk was selected to play heads-up no limit hold'em against A.I. poker bot Claudico, along with professional poker players Dong Kim, Jason Les, and Bjorn Li. Each player was set to play 20,000 hands against Claudico for a team total of 80,000 hands. The human players ended up defeating Claudico for 732,713 chips, with Polk beating the bot for 213,000. The team received a total of $100,000 for the victory.

Polk was involved in an argument with fellow poker player Ben Tollerene over a coaching deal.

In June 2017, Polk won the WSOP One Drop High Roller tournament, outlasting 130 players.

As of 2026, his total live tournament earnings exceed $10,500,000.

In September 2018, he said he will quit playing poker but would continue to add videos to his YouTube channel.

On March 16, 2020, Polk uploaded a video saying he doesn't like the game anymore and is formally quitting the poker industry after retiring from play in late 2018.

However, in July 2020, Polk challenged Daniel Negreanu to a high-stakes heads-up no-limit hold'em match, and Negreanu accepted. Polk subsequently came out of retirement to practice for the match, and played HUNL on WSOP.com. The duel ended on February 4, 2021, with Polk winning approximately $1,200,000 over 25,000 hands. He won an additional $530,000 in public side bets, with speculation that there were many more private ones.

Without including side-bets, Polk's combined winnings from his two heads-up challenges exceed $2,000,000. Including public side-bets, they approach $2,600,000.

In 2021, Doug Polk moved to Austin, Texas, and has been playing live poker locally. He has made appearances on The Lodge Live Stream in Round Rock. In January 2022, Polk became co-owner of The Lodge Card Club.

Doug placed 674th in the 2023 WSOP Main Event for a prize of $27,500.

World Series of Poker bracelets
Year	Event	Prize money
2014	$1,000 Turbo No Limit Hold'em	$251,969
2016	$1,000 Tag Team No Limit Hold'em (with Ryan Fee)	$153,358
2017	$111,111 High Roller for One Drop No Limit Hold'em	$3,686,865
