= PokerGO =

American poker content platform

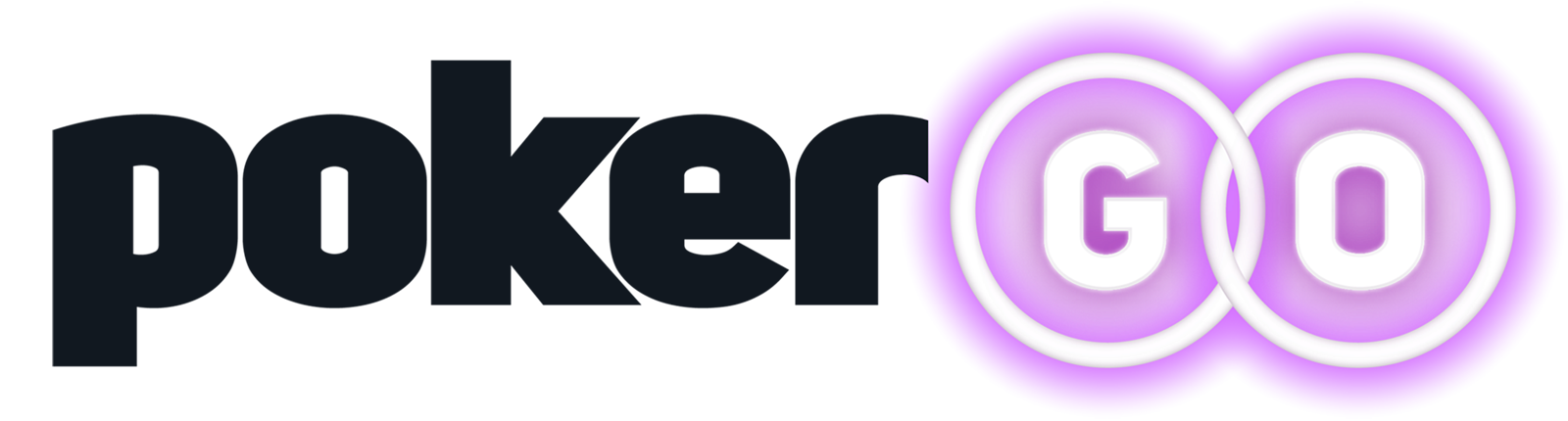
- Website type: OTT platform
- Founded: May 22, 2017; 9 years ago in Las Vegas, Nevada
- Area served: Worldwide (excluding mainland China)
- Key people: Mori Eskandani (President)
- Products: Streaming media; video on demand
- Website: pokergo.com
- Current status: Active

PokerGO is an over-the-top content platform based in Las Vegas, Nevada. PokerGO was launched in 2017 as a subscription-based streaming service, offering poker-centric online streaming.

The content offered on PokerGO includes poker tournaments, along with cash game-orientated shows.

== Content ==
PokerGO includes shows, tournament replays, and cash games. Other media includes episodes, live-streams, and recap videos. Live-streamed events can be accessed as on-demand videos after. Media scholars have discussed PokerGO's subscription model as part of a broader history of poker spectatorship spanning table chat, online forums, and Twitch livestreaming.

=== Poker tournaments and cash games ===
==== High Stakes Poker ====
High Stakes Poker is a cash game poker television program hosting a mix of professional and amateur poker players playing high stakes No-Limit Hold'em with buy-ins ranging from $100,000 to $500,000.

The show debuted in January 2006 and initially ran for seven seasons till May 2011. In February 2020, PokerGO announced that they had acquired the High Stakes Poker brand and the show's assets. In December 2020, a new season of High Stakes Poker aired on PokerGO, featuring returning players such as Tom Dwan and Phil Hellmuth alongside new players including Doug Polk and Chamath Palihapitiya.

There are nine seasons of High Stakes Poker and 126 episodes, and current hosts include Nick Schulman and A. J. Benza.

==== Poker After Dark ====
Poker After Dark is a poker television program that follows the development of one table of poker players over a period of time. The seasons are split into weeks with each given a theme based on the players involved. Poker After Dark originally began under a No-Limit Hold'em sit-n-go format before evolving to cash games that also featured different game variations such as Pot-Limit Omaha, 2-7 Triple Draw, H.O.R.S.E., or Short Deck.

The original series would see one table play over five episodes with the sixth episode being a director's cut. The show was acquired in 2017 and rebooted as a live stream show for four seasons before returning to the episodic format for season 12.

==== World Series of Poker ====
The World Series of Poker (WSOP) is a series of tournaments of most major poker variants that have been held annually in Las Vegas since 1970. The WSOP expanded to Europe in 2007, and Asia-Pacific in 2012.

PokerGO acquired the global television and digital media rights to the WSOP in 2017. The agreement expanded programming with live coverage on both ESPN and PokerGO. In 2020, WSOP Classic was added to the PokerGO library that included footage from both the WSOP Main Event and WSOP bracelet events from 2003—2010.

In April 2021, the WSOP signed a multi-year television rights deal with CBS Sports, which became the domestic broadcast partner for the Main Event and Gold Bracelet events, building on an existing arrangement under which PokerGO had streamed bracelet events alongside CBS's platforms. The WSOP Main Event returned to ESPN in 2026 under a new multi-year agreement, with ESPN providing daily coverage building to a live prime-time final table.

==== Super High Roller Bowl ====
The Super High Roller Bowl is a recurring high-stakes No-Limit Hold'em poker tournament held at various locations around the world since 2015. After beginning in Las Vegas, the Super High Roller Bowl has expanded to Macau, London, Bahamas, Australia, and Russia, as well as having an online event on partypoker in 2020.

==== U.S. Poker Open ====
The U.S. Poker Open is a poker tournament series hosted in the PokerGO Studio since 2018. The series features a variety of events at different buy-in amounts and crowns a series champion each year. Previous series champions include Stephen Chidwick (2018) and David Peters (2019).

==== Poker Masters ====
Held since 2017, the Poker Masters is a poker tournament series hosted in the PokerGO Studio. The series awards a Purple Jacket to the overall champion, and winners include Steffen Sontheimer (2017), Ali Imsirovic (2018), and Sam Soverel (2019). In 2020, the event moved online to partypoker, and Alexandros Kolonias won the championship.

=== Original programming ===
==== Pokerography ====
Pokerography is a 23-episode biopic series profiling players' lives and poker careers, including Antonio Esfandiari, Chris Moneymaker, and Phil Hellmuth.

==== Super High Roller Club ====
Presented by Ali Nejad, Super High Roller Club is a six-part series in which poker players discuss their careers, including Brandon Adams, Antonio Esfandiari, and Daniel Negreanu.

==== Real Talk ====
Real Talk is a roundtable talk show hosted by Remko Rinkema, featuring poker players such as Liv Boeree, Justin Bonomo, and Maria Ho discussing topics related to the game.

==== The Big Blind ====
The Big Blind is a poker trivia show. Host Jeff Platt tests three contestants each week on their knowledge of Las Vegas, casinos, gambling, and poker.

==== Legends of the Game ====
Legends of the Game is a six-part docuseries about legendary gamblers including Benny Binion, Stu Ungar, and David "Chip" Reese.

==== Dead Money ====
Dead Money follows poker professional Matt Berkey as he prepares to play the 2016 Super High Roller Bowl. Although predominantly a cash game player, Berkey is set to play his biggest buy-in poker tournament of $300,000, and Dead Money gives viewers a unique look into his strategy and decision-making on the way to him finishing in fifth-place for $1,100,000.

==== Additional programming ====
Additional programming includes The Championship Run, Stories from the Felt, Poker Nights, and Grinders, among other original series.

In June 2025, PokerGO acquired the rights to the National Heads-Up Poker Championship brand from NBC Sports, and later that year partnered with PokerStars to relaunch the tournament for the first time in more than a decade, with episodes debuting on Peacock before joining the PokerGO library.

== Device support and technical details ==
=== Devices ===
PokerGO is accessible via web browser and through apps for iOS, Android, Apple TV, Roku, and Amazon Fire TV devices. PokerGO is available worldwide except in China.

=== Service plans ===
PokerGO launched with a two-tier subscription model: monthly and annual. PokerGO is now on a three-tier subscription model: monthly, quarterly, and annual.

== PokerGO Studio ==
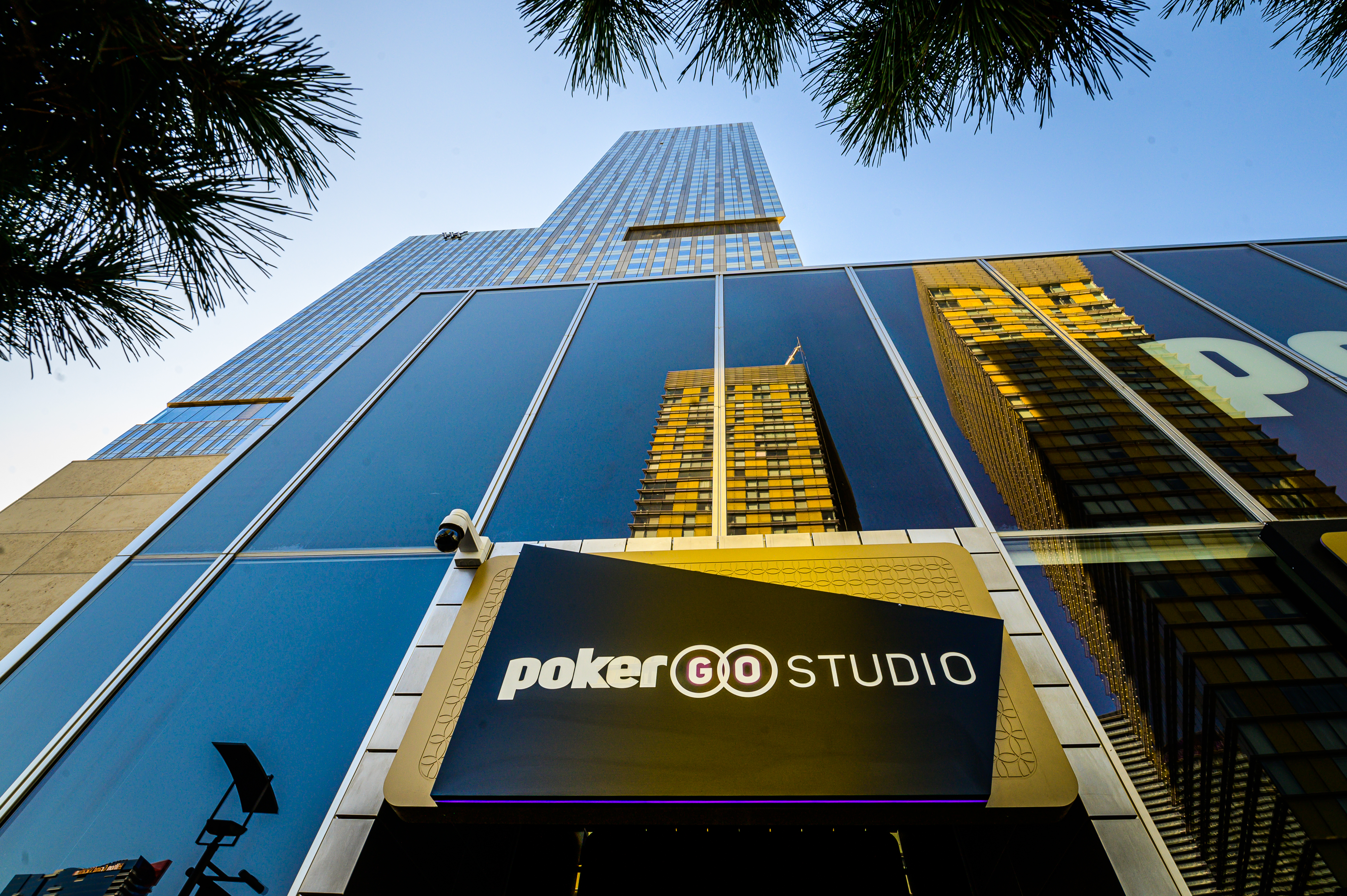
PokerGO Studio at ARIA Resort & Casino

PokerGo announced in April 2018 that it would build a 10,000-square-foot PokerGO Studio at the Aria Resort and Casino, with a capacity of up to 300 people.

The PokerGO Studio opened in May 2018 with the filming of Poker After Dark. Its opening week featured $100/$200 No-Limit Hold'em cash games with players including Daniel Negreanu and Phil Hellmuth.

The first tournament series at the PokerGO Studio was held later that month with the 2018 Super High Roller Bowl attracting 48 players. Justin Bonomo defeated Daniel Negreanu heads-up to win the $5,000,000 first-place prize and his second Super High Roller Bowl title.

=== Poker ===
The PokerGO Studio is the home for PokerGO-owned live events from poker tournaments to cash games.

The Super High Roller Bowl, U.S. Poker Open, and Poker Masters tournament series have been held inside the PokerGO Studio since 2018, and new PokerGO shows of High Stakes Duel and High Stakes Feud were filmed in the PokerGO Studio. It has also hosted World Poker Tour final tables including the WPT Bobby Baldwin Classic and WPT Five Diamond World Poker Classic.

The PokerGO Studio also hosts cash games including Poker After Dark, High Stakes Poker, Friday Night Poker, Dolly's Game, and Rob's Home Game. Poker After Dark originally filmed at South Point Casino, Golden Nugget, and Aria Resort and Casino, before relocating to the PokerGO Studio during Season 9. High Stakes Poker originally filmed at the Golden Nugget, The Palms, South Point Casino, and the Bellagio Resort & Casino, before relocating to the PokerGO Studio when the show relaunched for Season 8 after a nearly 10-year hiatus.

Other poker events held from inside the PokerGO Studio include the Global Poker Awards.
