= Daniel Negreanu =

Canadian poker player (born 1974)

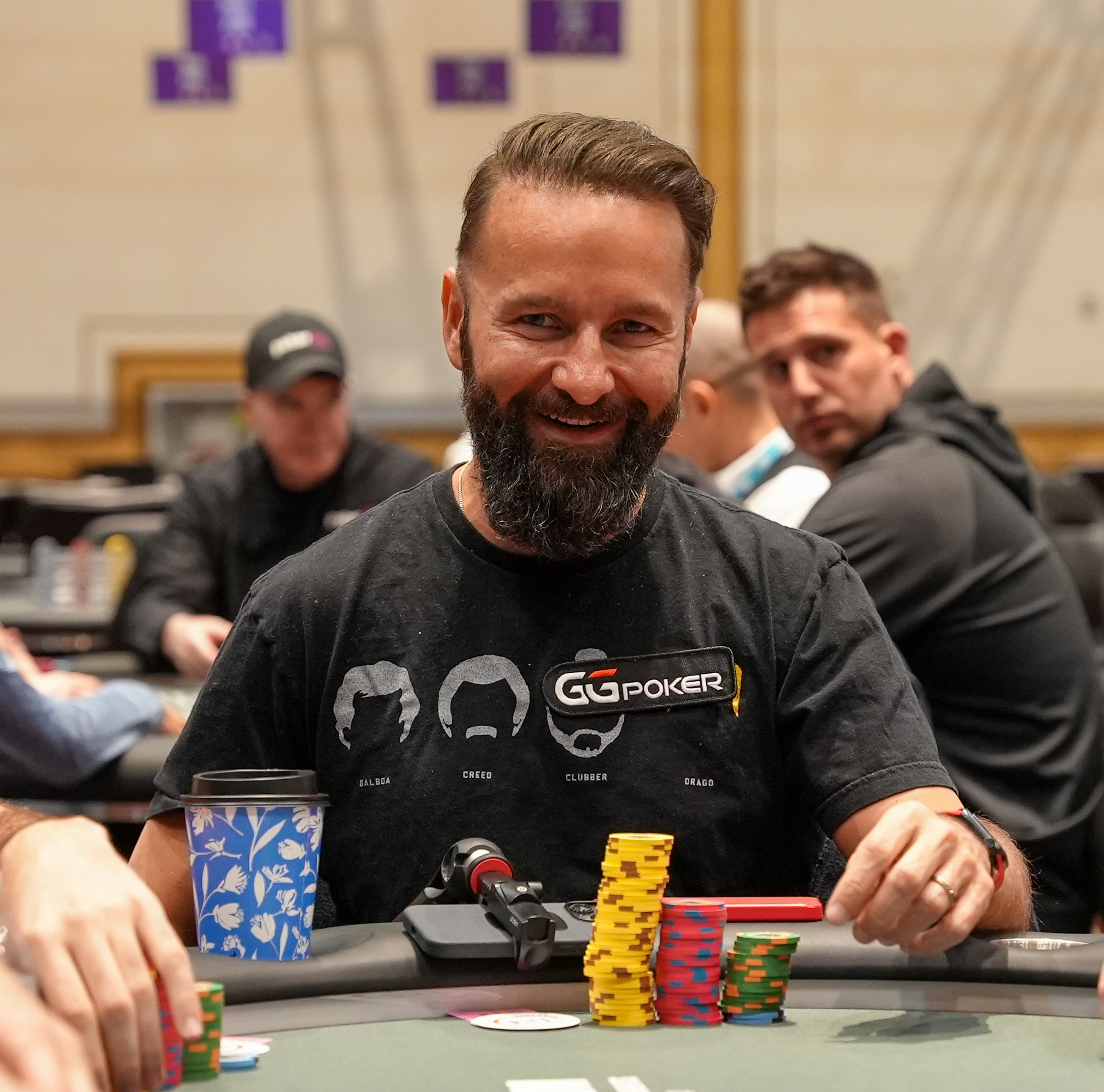
- Negreanu playing at the 2022 World Series of Poker
- Nicknames: Kid Poker, DNegs
- Born: July 26, 1974 (age 52); Toronto, Ontario, Canada

World Series of Poker
- Bracelets: 8
- Final tables: 98
- Money finishes: 366
- Highest WSOP Main Event finish: 11th, 2001, 2015

World Poker Tour
- Titles: 2
- Final tables: 9
- Money finishes: 25

European Poker Tour
- Title: None
- Final tables: 3
- Money finishes: 6

Daniel Negreanu (/nɪˈɡrɑːnuː/; born July 26, 1974) is a Canadian professional poker player who has won eight World Series of Poker (WSOP) bracelets and two World Poker Tour (WPT) championship titles. In 2014, independent poker ranking service Global Poker Index recognized Negreanu as the best poker player of the previous decade.

As of August 2025, he has the seventh-highest live tournament poker money winnings of all time, with US$56.9 million. He was named the WSOP Player of the Year in 2004 and 2013, making him the only player to receive the accolade more than once. He was also the 2004–2005 WPT Player of the Year. He is one of four players, along with Billy Baxter, Jay Heimowitz, and Phil Hellmuth to have won a WSOP Bracelet in 4 different decades. He is the first player to make a final table at each of the three WSOP bracelet-awarding locations (Las Vegas, Europe, and Asia-Pacific), and the first to win a bracelet at each. In 2014, he was inducted into the Poker Hall of Fame.

== Early life ==
Negreanu was born in Toronto, Ontario, in 1974, seven years after his parents, Annie and Constantin, emigrated from Romania. He can speak Romanian fluently. The Negreanus had hoped to start a new life in the United States but ended up settling in Toronto where Constantin worked as an electrician and sold confectionery. Daniel is five years younger than his brother Mike. At an early age, Negreanu was ambitious, stating in a 2009 interview "From the age of four, I thought I'd be rich. I told my mom I'd build a house out of Popsicle sticks and move to California."

He attended Pineway Public School in North York, where the principal complained to his mother about Daniel's "poor manners or behavior" and threatened to expel him for "ignoring the school rules." While nursing dreams of a career as a professional snooker player, the then 15-year-old learned to play poker. At the age of 16, he was spending time in pool halls, hustling, betting on sports, and playing cards.

When he was several credits short of graduation, he dropped out of high school and began his life as a rounder playing at local charity casinos, usually at Casino Country and Fundtime Games and looking for illegal games around the city. While in Toronto, he met and began dating Evelyn Ng, who would also become a well-known professional poker player. After building a bankroll, he left for Las Vegas at the age of 22 to pursue his dream of becoming a professional poker player. However, "The Strip" got the better of him and he was forced to move back home to Toronto to rebuild his bankroll.

== Poker career ==
Negreanu is an accomplished tournament and cash game player. He has eight World Series of Poker (WSOP) bracelets and two World Poker Tour (WPT) championships. He has also reached multiple WSOP and WPT final tables and won various other tournament titles. Negreanu was named the 2004 Card Player Player of the Year and the WSOP Player of the Year. He was also named the 2004–05 WPT Player of the Year. In 2006, Negreanu was named "Favorite Poker Player" at Card Player Magazine's Player of the Year Awards Gala. In 2013, he captured two WSOP bracelets and another WSOP Player of the Year award, becoming the only player to win the award twice. In November 2014, Negreanu was inducted into the Poker Hall of Fame in Las Vegas.

Negreanu has regularly played the "Big Game" in Bobby's Room, in the Bellagio casino, Las Vegas, where the limits are $400–800 or greater and the games are mixed. He is a self-professed action junkie who claims to always seek new challenges and set high goals for himself. Unlike many players, he is outspoken about his results and regularly posts updates in the Full Contact Poker forums. Some of Negreanu's success is attributed to his ability to read opponents. When asked about this, Negreanu explained that the most important skill he employs is observing what hands his opponents play and how capable they are of playing them.

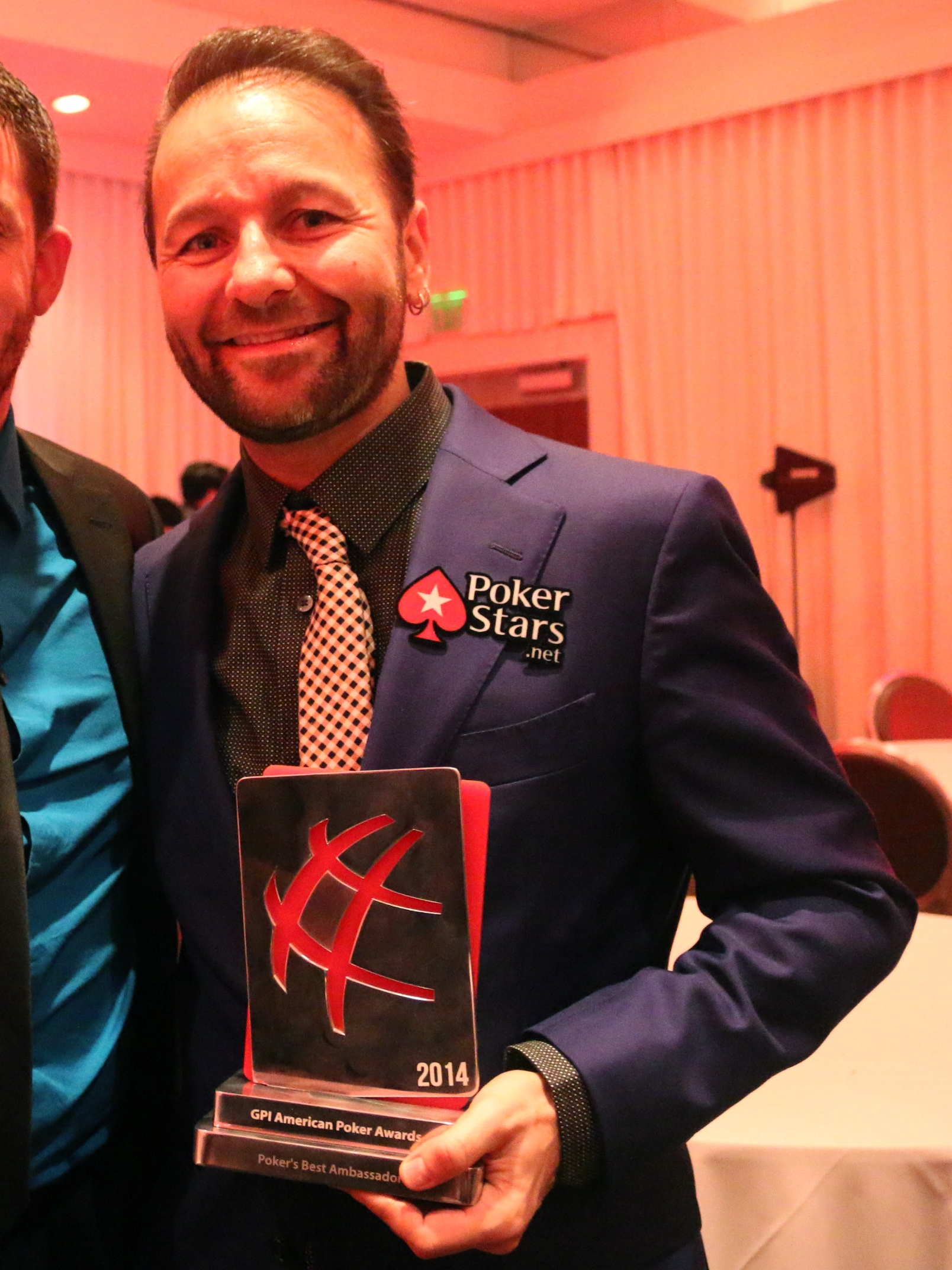
Negreanu receiving the award for Poker's Best Ambassador at the American Poker Awards in 2015.

=== Tournament poker ===
==== World Series of Poker ====
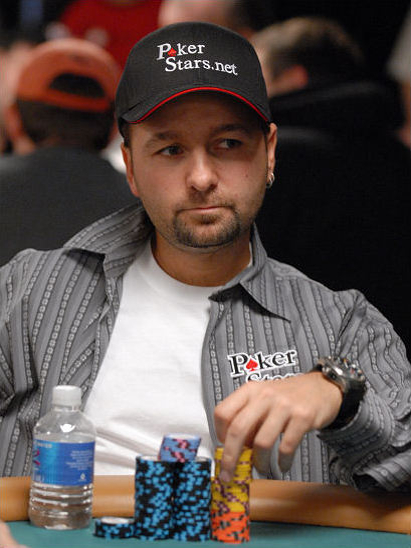
Negreanu at the 2007 World Series of Poker

Negreanu's first cash at the WSOP was also his first WSOP bracelet. Negreanu won $169,460 in the $2,000 Pot Limit Hold'em event in the 1998 World Series of Poker, becoming the youngest WSOP bracelet winner—a record he held until 2004 (Scott Fischman). Negreanu has since captured another seven bracelets, including the $50,000 Poker Players Championship in 2024 and the $100,000 High Roller Pot-Limit Omaha in 2026. He has 36 career WSOP final table appearances, including two apiece at the WSOP Europe and at the WSOP Asia-Pacific, and 103 money finishes.

World Series of Poker bracelets
Year	Tournament	Prize
1998	$2,000 Pot Limit Hold'em	$169,460
2003	$2,000 S.H.O.E.	$100,440
2004	$2,000 Limit Hold'em	$169,100
2008	$2,000 Limit Hold'em	$204,874
2013A	A$10,000 No Limit Hold'em Main Event	A$1,038,825
2013E	€25,600 High Roller No Limit Hold'em	€725,000
2024	$50,000 Poker Players Championship	$1,178,703
2026	$100,000 High Roller Pot-Limit Omaha	$2,257,718

An "A" following a year denotes bracelet(s) won at the World Series of Poker Asia-Pacific
An "E" following a year denotes bracelet(s) won at the World Series of Poker Europe

In addition to his 8 bracelets, he also won a WSOP Circuit ring in 2006. After winning the tournament, he explained his strategy and provided some insights into his play: "I had a strategy designed for each individual player and pretty much followed it at the final table. The key to winning for me is that I stayed out of marginal situations. I don't want to get into a race with 6-6 against A-K and hope to stay alive. I think what I am best at is playing after the flop, and I wanted to get as many situations as I could where I was up against (an opponent) and could take them on after the flop. My goal is to see the most flops I can. I like to set traps. I let (opponents) get involved, and then trap them. If I get them drawing dead (which happened twice at the final table in big pots)—that's always the plan."

==== World Poker Tour ====
World Poker Tour Titles
Year	Tournament	Prize (US$)
2004	$10,000 Borgata Poker Open	$1,009,100
2004	$15,000 Five Diamond World Poker Classic	$1,795,218

==== Spring Championship of Online Poker (SCOOP) ====
SCOOP Titles
Year	Tournament	Prize (US$)
2013	$5,200 PL Omaha [6-Max]	$216,000

==== World Championship of Online Poker (WCOOP) ====
WCOOP Titles
Year	Tournament	Prize (US$)
2016	$2,100 HORSE Championship $200K GTD	$61,865.47

PokerGo Tour (PGT)

PGT Titles
Year	Tournament	Prize (US$)
2021	PokerGO Cup #7 – $50,000 NLH	$700,000
2021	Poker Masters #5 – $10,000 NLH	$178,200
2022	PokerGO Cup #6 – $25,000 NLH	$350,000
2022	Wynn High Roller #2 – $15,300 NLH	$216,000
2022	Super High Roller Bowl VII – $300,000 NLH	$3,312,000
2024	PGT Last Chance #1: $10,100 No-Limit Hold'em	$218,400
2024	PGT PLO Series #3 – $5,100 Pot-Limit Omaha	$147,500
2024	WSOP #58 – $50,000 Poker Players Championship	$1,178,703
2024	PGT PLO Series II #6 – $10,100 Pot-Limit Omaha	$265,200
2025	PGT Mixed Games #6: $15,200 Dealer's Choice	$292,500
2025	PGT PLO Series #3: $5,100 Pot-Limit Omaha	$182,850

==== Other notable tournaments ====
Negreanu's first major successes on the tournament poker scene came in 1997 with three tournament wins, including two events at the World Poker Finals at Foxwoods Resort Casino, earning $55,064.

In November 2008, Negreanu won the fourth-annual British Columbia Poker Championships main event, topping a field of 690 players (a personal high for Daniel), and earning $371,910 CAD (US$299,951).

In 2014, he was the runner-up in The Big One for One Drop which paid him $8,288,001. The runner-up finish marked the highest live cash for Negreanu. The event was held at the WSOP but was not eligible for a WSOP bracelet.

Negreanu won $1 million as the winner of the 2016 Shark Cage tournament organized by PokerStars.net.

As of January 2026, his total live tournament winnings exceed $57,600,000. His 292 cashes at the WSOP account for over $25,800,000 of those winnings.

In October 2022, he won $3,312,000 in the $300,000 buy-in Super High Roller Bowl VII.

==== Cash games ====
In addition to Negreanu's regular appearances in the big game at Bobby's Room, he played in all seven seasons of the television show High Stakes Poker. He also played in two seasons of PokerStars Big Game.

=== Online poker and sponsorship ===
In December 2005, Negreanu became the professional spokesperson for an online poker site called Poker Mountain. He played at this cardroom under the screen name "KidPoker". In June 2005 he announced his decision to terminate that relationship due to software issues that were problematic enough to cause a shutdown of the site. In 2006, he used Full Contact Poker to launch a competition to select a protégé, whom Daniel would attempt to mold into a world-class live tournament poker player. He agreed to pay the protégé's entry fee into four $10,000 buy-in events. Daniel's first protégé was Brian Fidler. In 2007, Daniel ran a second protégé promotion, which was won by Anthony Mak.

In June 2007, Negreanu signed with PokerStars, joining Chris Moneymaker and many other professional poker players as a member of Team PokerStars. His Full Contact Poker site has since returned to being a forum and informational site. After "Black Friday" (the 2011 US government crackdown on online poker), Negreanu moved back to Canada in order to continue playing online poker on PokerStars. On May 23, 2019, after nearly 12 years as a member of Team PokerStars, Negreanu announced he and PokerStars were parting ways.

Negreanu is a brand ambassador and spokesperson for GGPoker since 2019.

=== Heads-up challenge ===
On July 29, 2020, after a years-long feud with fellow poker pro Doug Polk, Negreanu publicly accepted a challenge to a high-stakes grudge match. They played 25,000 hands of No-Limit Texas Hold'em at $200/$400 stakes. The duel ended on 4 February 2021 with Polk winning approximately $1,200,000 over 25,000 hands.

=== High Stakes Duel ===
In 2021, Daniel Negreanu challenged Phil Hellmuth to a heads-up match after Phil Hellmuth was critical of Daniel's plays in his heads-up match against Doug Polk. The two played three rounds in High Stakes Duel 2, which aired on PokerGO, with the buy-in doubling from the initial $50,000 to $200,000 by the third round. Phil Hellmuth beat Negreanu in all three rounds, winning a total of $350,000. As per the rules, he was allowed to cash out his winnings after winning three rounds, although Negreanu wanted to continue playing.

In 2023, it was announced that Negreanu would take on Eric Persson in High Stakes Duel 4 in May. Negreanu defeated Persson in Round 1 to win the $100,000 prize pool. Round 2 was scheduled for August, with Negreanu facing Doug Polk. Negreanu defeated Polk and took home the championship belt and $200,000.

=== Poker Masters ===
In September 2021, Daniel Negreanu had some success in PokerGo's Poker Masters tournaments. He placed 3rd in Poker Masters 2, a $10,000 buy-in event, and won $103,200. He placed 1st in Poker Masters 5, another $10,000 buy-in event, winning $178,200. In the tenth event, a $25,000 buy-in tournament, he placed 3rd for $152,000.

=== Other poker activities ===
Upon opening, the Wynn Las Vegas resort recruited him as their "Poker Ambassador" to play for any stake in their poker room. The arrangement lasted until October 2005, when he opted out because it was restricting his ability to play for high stakes outside the Wynn.

Negreanu has played poker on various TV shows such as Late Night Poker, Poker After Dark, and High Stakes Poker, as well as serving as a commentator and stand-in host on Ultimate Poker Challenge. He also appeared in the third season of Poker Superstars Invitational Tournament. In January 2007, Negreanu appeared in the Fox Reality original series Rob and Amber: Against the Odds, in which he mentored reality television personality Rob Mariano in his bid to become a professional poker player.

In May 2008, Negreanu's book Power Hold'em Strategy was released. The book resembles the Doyle Brunson book Super/System in that it has contributions from several other poker players, including Evelyn Ng, Erick Lindgren, Paul Wasicka, Todd Brunson, and David Williams. Negreanu's section presents and explains the strategy of small ball poker. Negreanu is also featured in the 2006 poker video game Stacked with Daniel Negreanu, providing tips and hints as to how to play effectively. He has written over 100 articles for CardPlayer Magazine and contributed to Doyle Brunson's revised book, Super System II. He has tutored on the web as part of Poker School Online and also personally given lessons to celebrities such as Tobey Maguire and Shannon Elizabeth. In addition to his poker books, Negreanu has created a 38-section Master Class teaching poker theory and play through video.

== Other ventures ==
Negreanu made a cameo appearance as a poker player playing against the mutant Gambit in the film X-Men Origins: Wolverine. He also played a poker player in The Grand, and he appeared as himself in the film Lucky You. On season two of Sports Science, he tried to fool a lie detector. He also appeared in Katy Perry's music video for "Waking Up in Vegas" as a poker player. In 2013, he appeared on an episode of the CBC Television program Mr. D, again playing himself. He also appeared in a TV series dedicated to poker called Tilt in 2005. Daniel was a major advocate of the move to bring the National Hockey League to Las Vegas, along with Malaysian billionaire and fellow poker player Richard Yong.

Negreanu is also a fan of Hearthstone. After picking up the game in 2015, he began streaming it alongside poker on Twitch and was invited to a showmatch during the Hearthstone World Championship at BlizzCon 2015 in Anaheim, California, against former StarCraft: Brood War pro and fellow WSOP and WPT champion Bertrand "ElkY" Grospellier, which he won 3–1.

In September 2015, Negreanu posed for a PETA vegan campaign. In January 2021 Chess.com announced that he would play in the third edition of the PogChamps chess tournament. In 2018, Negreanu was promoted and credited as an associate producer for a documentary about veganism in sports, The Game Changers.

== Personal life ==
In August 2005, Negreanu married Lori Lin Weber. They separated in November 2007 and later divorced. In May 2019, he married Amanda Leatherman. In 2024, Negreanu and his wife Amanda, started their own Podcast called "The Mania Podcast".

Negreanu has a blog at Full Contact Poker where he posts his thoughts and feelings about life, politics and poker. He became a vegetarian in 2000 and has been vegan since 2006, claiming it makes him a better player. He became a US citizen in March 2016.

On October 1, 2020, Negreanu was one of 12 individuals named in a $330 million defamation lawsuit brought by poker professional Mike Postle. Others named in the suit include Phil Galfond, ESPN and Negreanu's heads-up challenge opponent Doug Polk. In April 2021, the lawsuit was dropped.

== Bibliography ==
- Hold'em Wisdom for all Players (2007) ISBN 1-58042-210-1
- Power Hold'em Strategy (2008) ISBN 1-58042-204-7
- More Hold'em Wisdom for all Players (2008) ISBN 1-58042-224-1
