= Maria Ho =

Taiwanese-American poker player and television host/commentator

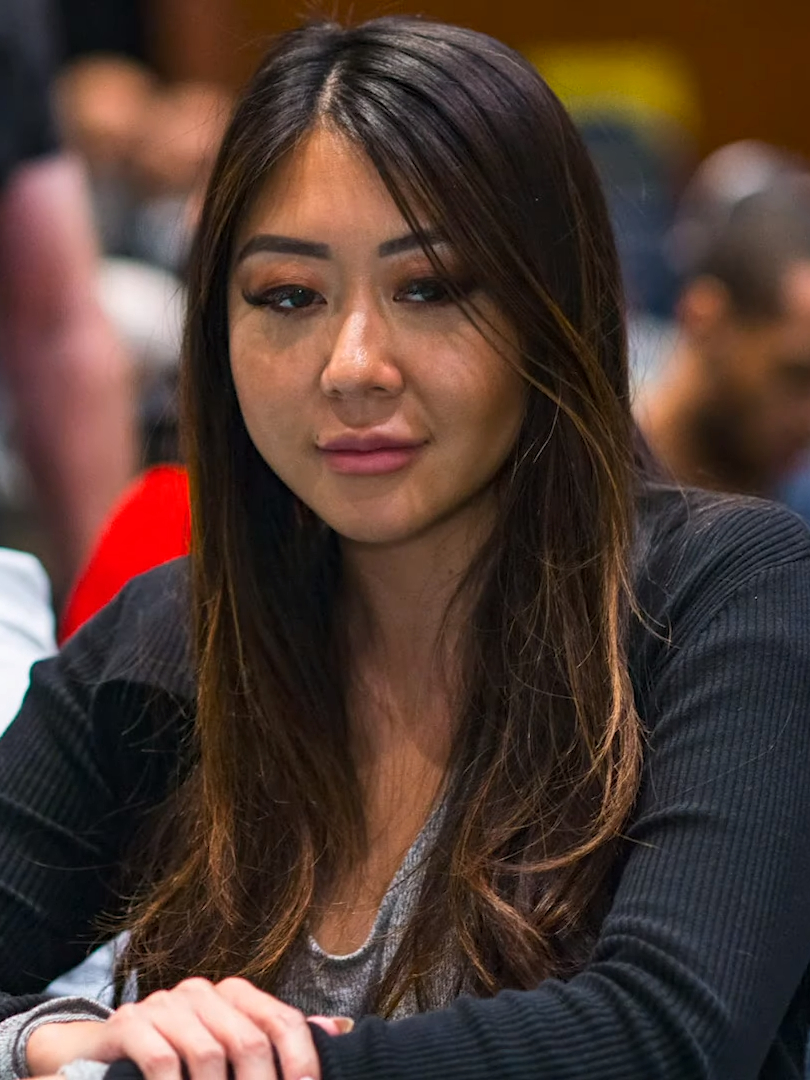
- Born: March 6, 1983 (age 43); Taipei, Taiwan

World Series of Poker
- Bracelet: None
- Final tables: 8
- Money finishes: 80
- Highest WSOP Main Event finish: 38th, 2007

World Poker Tour
- Title: 1
- Final tables: 4
- Money finishes: 14

Chinese name
- Traditional Chinese: 何亭雨
- Simplified Chinese: 何亭雨
Transcriptions
Standard Mandarin
- Hanyu Pinyin: hé tíng yǔ

Maria Ho (traditional Chinese: 何亭雨; simplified Chinese: 何亭雨; pinyin: Hé tíng yǔ; born March 6, 1983, in Taipei, Taiwan) is a Taiwanese-American poker player and television host/commentator. One of the top-ranked female poker players in the world and a Women in Poker Hall of Fame inductee, she has won more than $5,000,000 in live tournaments.

In 2011, she was the No. 2 ranked female player in the world. She has remained on the Top 20 Women's Yearly Leaderboard since 2016.

Ho's live tournament poker record includes 80 World Series of Poker cashes, eight WSOP final tables (including WSOPC and WSOPE final tables), 14 World Poker Tour cashes, four WPT final tables, one WPT title, and numerous additional final tables on the professional poker circuit.

She is a Global Poker Award winner for Broadcaster of the Year and the only player to be the World Series of Poker Main Event (US and Europe) "Last Woman Standing” four times; her highest finish was 38th out of 6,458 players in 2011.

She has been seen on many primetime television shows, making it to "Hollywood Week" on season 3 of American Idol, competing on the fifteenth season of The Amazing Race, and appearing as a celebrity guest on Deal or No Deal in January 2019.

== Early life ==
Born in Taiwan, Maria moved with her family to the United States when she was four. She grew up outside Los Angeles in Arcadia, California. She is fluent in Mandarin.

Maria's older sister is media personality and psychologist Judy Ho, who hosted the CBS syndicated talk show Face The Truth.

Ho started playing poker in college. She was drawn to the psychology and competitive spirit of the game and soon went from playing games with college friends to playing limit cash games at nearby Indian casinos. When Maria graduated from UCSD in 2005 with a major in communications and a minor in law, she had gone from playing low limits to high-stakes cash games and had grown her poker bankroll to the point that she decided to become a professional poker player.

== Career ==
=== World Series of Poker ===
Ho's first major tournament success came at the 2007 World Series of Poker, where she was the last woman remaining in the Main Event field, placing 38th out of 6,358 players and earning a $237,865 payday. In 2014, she finished 77th of 6,683 players. Her 27th-place "Last Woman Standing" finish at the 2011 World Series of Poker Europe Main Event and a 6th-place final-table finish at the 2017 WSOP Europe Main Event make Ho the only player to hold the WSOP Main Event Last Woman Standing title four times over (between the US and Europe Main Event).

At the 2011 World Series of Poker, Ho achieved the best finish by a woman during the entire 57-event series with her 2nd place in Event #4: $5000 No-Limit Hold'Em, for a payday of $540,020. It was the closest Ho has come to winning a World Series of Poker gold bracelet.

At the 2012 World Series of Poker, Ho was the Most-Cashing Female of the series, with six individual tournament cashes. At the 2014 WSOP, she earned eight cashes.

As of 2023, Maria is ranked 3rd on the WSOP Women’s All-Time Money List.

=== World Poker Tour ===
In March 2019, for a second year in a row, she final-tabled the LA Poker Classic $25,000 High Roller tournament; her victory earned her second-highest live tournament score of $276,690. The following month she made the 6-handed TV final table of the WPT Seminole Hard Rock Poker Showdown Main Event, taking 3rd place for $344,960.

=== Host and Commentator ===
Ho's commentary career began in 2013 when she joined the Heartland Poker Tour season 9 broadcast team as a co-host and strategic commentator. She was the first woman to be hired by a poker television broadcast as the resident strategic commentator,

Ho has since commentated for CBS Sports The Final Table, ESPN's coverage of the World Series of Poker, and Amazon eSports Mobile Masters Invitational series. She has been an in-house commentator for PokerGO since it started in 2018, regularly contributing to live broadcasts including the US Poker Open, Super High Roller Bowl, and Poker Masters.

In 2019, Ho won the Global Poker Award for Broadcaster of the Year, then co-hosted the ceremonies the following year.

She has also written for several print publications, and wrote a chapter in the book Winning Women of Poker: Secret Strategies Revealed.

=== Awards and accolades ===
In 2018, Ho was inducted into the Women In Poker Hall of Fame, the first year she was eligible.

In 2019 and 2020, she received nominations for a Global Poker Award as Broadcaster of the Year, taking home the award in 2019.

Early in her career, the World Poker Tour named Maria in their WPT "Ones to Watch", during seasons 9 and 10, and from 2012-2014 she received three consecutive nominations from the Bluff Reader's Choice Awards, for "Favorite Female Poker Player".

=== Invitationals ===
Ho has received invitations to play in various types of games all over the world. In 2008, she traveled to Hong Kong to play in the World Mahjong Tour, going head to head with Chinese and Taiwanese celebrities and professional Mahjong players.

For two consecutive years, she participated in the World Team Poker Invitational as a member of Team China, helping her team win in 2010.

In 2016, Ho was named one of 12 Team Managers (for Team LA Sunsets) in the inaugural season of the Global Poker League, drafting Emmy-winning actor Aaron Paul as one of her Wild Card picks, and coaching her team to the championship match.

She has won four PokerGO No-Limit Hold Em Sit-N-Go Invitationals:

- 2022: $10,000 "No Gamble, No Future" SNG ($50,000 win)
- 2019: $5,000 Poker After Dark "RGPS Showbound" Event 1 ($25,000 win)
- 2018: $10,000 Poker After Dark "888poker Week" Event 1 ($50,000 win)
- 2017: $10,000 Poker After Dark "Holidays with Hellmuth" Event 1 ($77,000 win)

=== Other poker related activities ===
On 8 December 2023, Maria Ho won the first season of Poker After Dark: Game of Gold, earning a prize of $456,000.
