= Poker After Dark =

American television program

- Presented by: Shana Hiatt (S1–2); Marianela Pereyra (S3); Leeann Tweeden (S4–7); Drea Renee (S8); Veronica Brill (S12–13)
- Narrated by: Ali Nejad
- Country of origin: United States
- No. of seasons: 13
- No. of episodes: 611 episodes 94 live streams (134 weeks consisting of 68 tournaments and 117 cash games)

Production
- Producers: Eric Drache; Mori Eskandani
- Production location: Las Vegas
- Running time: 1 hour (with commercials; about 42 minutes without); 6 hours when on PokerGO (with player breaks; about 5 hours, 20 minutes without)
- Production companies: Poker Productions; Echo Entertainment

Original release
- Network: NBC
- Release: January 1, 2007 – December 3, 2011
- Network: NBCSN
- Release: August 14, 2017 – October 4, 2021

Poker After Dark is an hour-long poker television program that originally aired on NBC, premiering on January 1, 2007. The series was canceled on December 3, 2011, following the "Black Friday" criminal case, which involved major sponsor Full Tilt Poker as one of the defendants. The show rebooted on August 14, 2017, with appearances from Tom Dwan, Daniel Negreanu, Antonio Esfandiari. Poker After Dark episodes are now filmed exclusively at the PokerGO Studio at ARIA Resort and Casino, and distributed on video streaming service PokerGO.

For its first two seasons, both of which originally aired in 2007, the show was presented by Shana Hiatt. The host for season 3 was Marianela Pereyra, and Leeann Tweeden took over starting with season 4. When the series returned on PokerGO in 2017, Drea Renee took over as lead presenter. Veronica Brill was introduced as the sideline reporter during season 12.

All seasons have contained voice-over commentary by Oliver "Ali" Nejad.

== Summary ==
The Poker After Dark format featured an "intimate look at one table as it develops over the week." Blinds start at $100/$200 and slowly escalate. Commentator Ali Nejad's commentary is limited, allowing viewers to hear much of the table talk among the players, all of whom are mic'ed. (The table talk occasionally reveals that the "week-long" series is taped in one long session.)

The series was originally structured as a series of week-long No Limit Texas hold 'em mini-tournaments for six top poker professionals. Each week the players vied for a $120,000 winner-takes-all prize pool, with each paying a $20,000 buy-in. (Note: Although the standard buy-in on Poker After Dark is $20,000, the buy-in for the Mega Match (which first aired the week of October 8, 2007) was $50,000.) By the end of the fifth show, a winner is determined. The sixth show was a "director's cut" that includes excerpts from the action from the previous five days, interspersed with talking heads commentary from the participants. Beginning with Season 4, the producers began to experiment with different formats, including no-limit cash games, and a double-elimination Heads Up battle between the first 4 winners of the National Heads-Up Poker Championship. Also, Seasons 3, 4 and 5 had a "Dream Table," pitting an amateur against five pros.

== Broadcast ==
Poker After Dark aired six times a week, at 2:05 a.m. ET (1:05 CT) Tuesday through Saturday, and then at 1:00 a.m. ET (12:00 CT) on Sundays, though times vary according to the preferences of the affiliates. The early Sunday show is a "director's cut" weekly summary of the previous week's shows.

Several NBC affiliates, most notably those owned by Post-Newsweek Stations, Barrington Broadcasting, some Raycom Media stations, WBBH-TV in Fort Myers, Florida (now owned by Hearst Television), and the LDS Church-owned KSL-TV in Salt Lake City refused to air the show due to management or locality objections against programs featuring gambling (the Post-Newsweek stations also refused to carry Face the Ace in August 2009), while other stations did not carry it due to existing syndication contracts precluding it from airing the series or to retain control of their overnight schedules. It was not aired entirely in the state of Texas due to the state's strict gambling laws.

NBC abruptly stopped airing Poker After Dark on September 23, 2011, a few days after Preet Bharara, the U.S. Attorney for the Southern District of New York, issued a statement alleging production underwriter Full Tilt Poker had perpetrated a Ponzi scheme on its customers. Replacing the show was a rebroadcast of the Hoda Kotb/Kathie Lee Gifford-hosted fourth hour of Today, and on the weekends, a second episode of In Wine Country from San Francisco Bay Area NBC station KNTV. NBC Sports has since removed their poker section entirely from their webpage, and previous episodes have been removed from Hulu. Although NBC did not issue a definitive statement regarding the schedule change or the future of the show, NBC Sports Senior Director of Communications Adam Freifeld has stated that NBC will "continue to evaluate our poker programming."

Since 2017, Poker After Dark has aired live each month exclusively on PokerGO. Full replays and highlight recaps are also available on demand for each episode.

=== International ===
In Canada Poker After Dark aired afternoons and late nights on Rogers Sportsnet and, since fall 2009 on the French network V.

In France Poker After Dark airs at night on RTL9. In Germany, it airs on SPORT1, with commentary provided by Michael Körner. In Ireland, Poker After Dark airs on Setanta Ireland and Setanta Sports 1 on most weeknights with little change from the US version. In The Netherlands, it airs on Veronica; episodes feature the original English commentary with Dutch subtitles. In Sweden, Poker After Dark airs on afternoons and nights on TV4 Sport and on TV 10 weekday nights at 01:30. In Denmark, it airs at night on TV3+. In Italy, Poker After Dark airs at night on POKERItalia24. In Poland, Poker After Dark airs during evenings on Sportklub and Sport Klub+; commentary is provided by Paweł Majewski and Marcin Grzywacz.. In Russia, the show airs on 7TV at 11:30 pm every day until the Febral, and now shows on REN-TV at 3:00 pm.

== Episodes ==
=== Season 1 (2007) ===
Season 1 was taped at the South Point Casino in Las Vegas, Nevada.

Week	Episodes	Original airdates	Title	Seat 1	Seat 2	Seat 3	Seat 4	Seat 5	Seat 6
1	1-6	Jan 1-6	Poker Brat Attack	Gus Hansen	Phil Hellmuth	Shawn Sheikhan	Annie Duke	Steve Zolotow	Huck Seed
2	7-12	Jan 8-13	Play Anything	Mike Matusow	Gabe Kaplan	David Grey	Doyle Brunson	Jerry Buss	Daniel Negreanu
3	13-18	Jan 15-20	WSOP Champions	Chris Moneymaker	Jamie Gold	Johnny Chan	Chris Ferguson	Doyle Brunson	Carlos Mortensen
4	19-24	Jan 22-27	Earphones Please	Sam Farha	Tony G	Mike Matusow	Phil Hellmuth	Phil Ivey	Andy Bloch
5	25-30	Jan 29-Feb 3	Phil Phil	Phil Hellmuth	Jennifer Harman	Phil Laak	Erik Seidel	Antonio Esfandiari	Doyle Brunson
6	31-36	Feb 12-17	Talking Heads	Michael Konik	Phil Gordon	Howard Lederer	Chad Brown	Gabe Kaplan	Mike Sexton
7	37-42	Feb 19-24	Against All Odds	Chris Ferguson	Clonie Gowen	Sam Farha	Gus Hansen	Ted Forrest	Tony G
8	43-48	Mar 12-17	Killer Table	Phil Ivey	Erick Lindgren	Jennifer Tilly	Patrik Antonius	Jennifer Harman	Phil Gordon
9	49-54	Apr 16-21	Loose Lips	Mike Matusow	Allen Cunningham	David Benyamine	Barry Greenstein	Shawn Sheikhan	John Juanda
10	55-60	May 14–19	Ladies' Week	Clonie Gowen	Evelyn Ng	Dee Luong	Vanessa Rousso	Jennifer Harman	Cyndy Violette

- Jennifer Harman was the only player to reach the final two players more than once.
- Doyle Brunson, Phil Hellmuth, Mike Matusow, and Jennifer Harman appeared in the most weeks for the season with three appearances each.

=== Season 2 (2007) ===
Season 2 was taped in May 2007 at the South Point Casino in Las Vegas.

Week	Episodes	Original airdates	Title	Seat 1	Seat 2	Seat 3	Seat 4	Seat 5	Seat 6
1	1-6	Jun 11-16	Golden Men	Jamie Gold	Joe Hachem	Greg Raymer	Huck Seed	Doyle Brunson	Johnny Chan
2	7-12	Jun 18-23	International	Gus Hansen	David Benyamine	Patrik Antonius	Daniel Negreanu	Marco Traniello	Brad Booth
3	13-18	Jun 25-30	Queens and Kings	Gabe Kaplan	Howard Lederer	Ali Nejad	Vanessa Rousso	Annie Duke	Kristy Gazes
4	19-24	Sep 10-15	World Series Legends	Doyle Brunson	Layne Flack	Phil Hellmuth	Chris Ferguson	Erik Seidel	T. J. Cloutier
5	25-30	Sep 17-22	WPT All-Stars	Erick Lindgren	Howard Lederer	Daniel Negreanu	Michael Mizrachi	Gus Hansen	Tuan Le
6	31-36	Sep 24-29	Live To Hurt	Antonio Esfandiari	Shawn Sheikhan	Mike Matusow	Phil Hellmuth	Phil Laak	Daniel Negreanu
7	37-42	Oct 1-6	Poker Prowess	Phil Laak	David Williams	Annie Duke	Andy Bloch	John Juanda	Clonie Gowen
8	43-48	Oct 8-13	Mega Match	David Benyamine	Allen Cunningham	Jennifer Harman	Phil Ivey	Barry Greenstein	Eli Elezra
9	49-54	Nov 5-10	Of Mouth and Men	Alan Boston	Antonio Esfandiari	Mike Sexton	Mike Matusow	Jamie Gold	Paul Wasicka
10	55-60	Nov 12-17	Show Open	Howard Lederer	Phil Ivey	Chris Ferguson	Phil Hellmuth	Jennifer Harman	Gus Hansen

- Week 8 (Mega Match) required a $50,000 buy-in rather than the usual $20,000, resulting in a $300,000 first prize.
- Week 10 (Show Open) was so named because the participants were those featured in the show's 2007 opening credits.
- Howard Lederer was the only player to reach the final two players more than once.
- Daniel Negreanu, Phil Hellmuth, Gus Hansen, and Howard Lederer appeared in the most weeks for the season with three appearances each.

=== Season 3 (2008) ===
Season 3 was taped in October 2007 at the South Point Casino in Las Vegas.

Week	Episodes	Original airdates	Title	Seat 1	Seat 2	Seat 3	Seat 4	Seat 5	Seat 6
1	1-6	Dec 31-Jan 5	Dream Table	Daniel Negreanu	Phil Hellmuth	Jennifer Harman	Mike Matusow	Scotty Nguyen	Ken Light
2	7-12	Jan 7-12	19th Hole	Gavin Smith	David Oppenheim	Erick Lindgren	Phil Ivey	Doyle Brunson	Daniel Negreanu
3	13-18	Jan 14-19	Hecklers	Gavin Smith	Sam Grizzle	Jean-Robert Bellande	Mike Matusow	Shawn Sheikhan	Phil Hellmuth
4	19-24	Feb 11-16	World Champions	Chris Ferguson	Johnny Chan	Berry Johnston	Jamie Gold	Phil Hellmuth	Huck Seed
5	25-30	Feb 18-23	Cowboys	Doyle Brunson	Chris Ferguson	Chau Giang	Andy Bloch	Hoyt Corkins	Gabe Kaplan
6	31-36	Feb 25-Mar 1	International	Patrik Antonius	Johnny Chan	Roland De Wolfe	Daniel Negreanu	Gus Hansen	John Juanda
7	37-42	Mar 24-29	Jam Up	David Williams	Howard Lederer	Mike Matusow	Barry Greenstein	Antonio Esfandiari	Eli Elezra
8	43-48	Mar 31-Apr 5	Gus and the Ladies	Gus Hansen	Vanessa Rousso	J. J. Liu	Clonie Gowen	Beth Shak	Erica Schoenberg
9	49-54	May 12–17	Love at First Raise	Jennifer Harman	David Benyamine	Jennifer Tilly	Marco Traniello	Erica Schoenberg	Phil Laak
10	55-60	May 19–24	Commentators	Mark Gregorich	Chad Brown	Ali Nejad	Robert Williamson III	Phil Gordon	Howard Lederer

- Week 1 (Dream Table) featured the winner of a Full Tilt Poker sponsored contest (Ken Light) and was billed as the five professionals Light chose to play against, though Light said in an interview during one of the week's episodes that he was only asked to list his favorite players, and did not know that the list would be used to form the table.
- Week 9 (Love at First Raise) featured three pairs of players who were couples at the time of filming: Jennifer Harman & Marco Traniello, David Benyamine & Erica Schoenberg, and Jennifer Tilly & Phil Laak.
- Phil Hellmuth reached the final two players three times, and Johnny Chan reached the final two players two times.
- Phil Hellmuth and Johnny Chan each won two sit-n-goes.
- Daniel Negreanu, Phil Hellmuth, and Mike Matusow appeared in the most weeks for the season with three appearances each.

=== Season 4 (2008) ===
Season 4 was taped in April 2008 at the South Point Casino in Las Vegas. Season 4 episode titles and presumed seating order taken from NBC's Web site.

Week	Episodes	Original airdates	Title	Seat 1	Seat 2	Seat 3	Seat 4	Seat 5	Seat 6
1	1-6	Jul 14-19	Cash Game #1	Tom Dwan	Phil Hellmuth	Mike Baxter	Allen Cunningham	Guy Laliberté	David Peat
2	7-12	Jul 21-26	Nets Vs. Vets	Brian Townsend	Doyle Brunson	Tom Dwan	Johnny Chan	Huck Seed	Andrew Robl
3	13-18	Jul 28-Aug 3	Heads Up Challenge	Phil Hellmuth	Ted Forrest	Paul Wasicka	Chris Ferguson		
4	19-24	Sep 22-Sep 27	Mission Impossible	Mike Matusow	Phil Laak	Phil Hellmuth	David Williams	Clonie Gowen	Gavin Smith
5	25-30	Sep 29-Oct 4	Dream II	Mike Matusow	Phil Hellmuth	Mike Sexton	Jennifer Harman	Gavin Smith	Paul Featherstone
6	31-36	Oct 6-Oct 11	Mayfair Club	Jay Heimowitz	Howard Lederer	Mickey Appleman	Dan Harrington	Steve Zolotow	Mike Shichtman
7	37-42	Oct 13-Oct 19	Cash Game #2	Patrik Antonius	Dee Tiller	Howard Lederer	Doyle Brunson	Gabe Kaplan	Eli Elezra

- Season 4 was the first time cash games were filmed.
- The two weeks of cash games were a $200/400 no-limit game instead of a winner take all tournament. During most of the second cash game, the players agreed to $100 antes and the occasional $800 straddle.
- Week 3 (Heads-Up Challenge) was a double elimination heads-up format featuring the first four winners of the National Heads-Up Poker Championship and required a $50,000 buy-in resulting in a winner-take-all $200,000 prize.
- Week 4 (Mission Impossible) was named in reference to Mike Matusow, who entered the game winless in three-plus seasons of the show, while each of his opponents had won at least once.
- Week 5 (Dream II) was the second tournament consisting of the winner of a Full Tilt Poker sponsored contest (Paul Featherstone) and the five professionals he chose to play against.
- Phil Hellmuth appeared in the most weeks for the season with five appearances, while Mike Matusow appeared in three weeks.

=== Season 5 (2009) ===
Most of Season 5 was taped December 19–21, 2008 at the Golden Nugget Las Vegas. The season's first three weeks include episodes originally announced as Season 4 episodes and were taped at South Point.

Week	Episodes	Original airdates	Title	Seat 1	Seat 2	Seat 3	Seat 4	Seat 5	Seat 6
1	1-6	Dec 29-Jan 3	Close but no Cigar	Andy Black	Lee Watkinson	Dewey Tomko	David Williams	Allen Cunningham	Mike Matusow
2	7-12	Jan 5-Jan 11	Speak Your Mind	Todd Brunson	Phil Hellmuth	Phil Gordon	Gabe Kaplan	Cory Zeidman	David Grey
3	13-18	Feb 9-Feb 14	Brilliant Minds	Brandon Adams	Chris Ferguson	Andy Bloch	Bill Chen	Jimmy Warren	David Sklansky
4	19-24	Feb 16-Feb 21	Nets vs. Vets Cash Game	Taylor Caby	Cole South	Gabe Kaplan	David Benefield	Doyle Brunson	Eli Elezra
5	25-30	Mar 23-Mar 28	Dream Table III	Johnny Chan	Jennifer Tilly	Arnold Thimons	Mike Matusow	Phil Laak	Daniel Negreanu
6	31-36	Mar 30-Apr 4	International III	Brad Booth	Allen Cunningham	David Benyamine	John Juanda	John Phan	Ivan Demidov
7	37-42	May 4-May 9	Hellmuth Bash Cash Game I	Tom Dwan	Kenny Tran	Phil Laak	Antonio Esfandiari	Phil Hellmuth	Bob Safai
8	43-48	May 11-May 16	Hellmuth Bash Cash Game II	Tom Dwan	Antonio Esfandiari	Kenny Tran	Phil Hellmuth	Bob Safai	Phil Laak
9	49-54	Jun 15-Jun 20	Sit-n-Talk	Jennifer Harman	Mike Matusow	Antonio Esfandiari	Jean-Robert Bellande	Vanessa Rousso	David Grey
10	55-60	Jun 22-Jun 27	Celebrities and Mentors	Barry Greenstein	Jason Alexander	Phil Gordon	Orel Hershiser	Don Cheadle	Gavin Smith
11	61-66	Sep 7-Sep 12	Top Guns Cash Game #1	Tom Dwan	Patrik Antonius	Howard Lederer	Eli Elezra	Ilari Sahamies	Phil Ivey
12	67-72	Sep 14-Sep 19	Top Guns Cash Game #2	Eli Elezra	Tom Dwan	Howard Lederer	Phil Ivey	Patrik Antonius	Ilari Sahamies
13	73-78	Sep 21-Sep 26	Magnificent Six	Phil Hellmuth	Chris Ferguson	Howard Lederer	Phil Ivey	Doyle Brunson	Daniel Negreanu
14	79-84	Sep 28-Oct 3	USA vs. Italy	Howard Lederer	Marco Traniello	Dario Minieri	Erick Lindgren	Max Pescatori	Chris Ferguson
15	85-90	Dec 7-Dec 12	Railbird Heaven Cash Game #1	Patrik Antonius	Daniel Negreanu	Gus Hansen	Phil Ivey	Tom Dwan	Phil Hellmuth
16	91-96	Dec 14-Dec 19	Railbird Heaven Cash Game #2	Tom Dwan	Gus Hansen / David Peat	Phil Ivey	Phil Hellmuth	Patrik Antonius	Daniel Negreanu

- Season 5 would see the first relocation of Poker After Dark as it moved from South Point Casino to the Golden Nugget Las Vegas.
- Season 5 was the first season with more cash game weeks then sit-n-go weeks.
- Close but no Cigar Week consisted of players who at the time of taping had played at a WSOP Main Event final table but did not win.
- Mike Matusow is the only pro to participate in all three Dream Table games.
- The two weeks of Hellmuth Bash games were the first time the same six players appeared over 10 consecutive episodes of play.
- Celebrities and Mentors week was completed in four episodes. The director's cut was aired as the fifth episode, and a "Best Of" look back at Seasons 1-5 was aired at the usual time for the director's cut.
- Eli Elezra has only played in cash games or during weeks when the final prize was larger than the normal $120,000. Until this season, he always occupied Seat 6 when appearing.
- Magnificent Six featured five of the six players shown in this season's opening credits.
- Gus Hansen's participation in the Railbird Heaven Cash Game was his first appearance since Season 3.
- Tom Dwan appeared in the most weeks for the season with six appearances, while Phil Hellmuth and Phil Ivey appeared in five weeks each.

=== Season 6 (2010) ===
Season 6 was taped in October 2009 at the Golden Nugget Las Vegas and is scheduled to have 13 weeks of episodes.

Week	Episodes	Original airdates	Title	Seat 1	Seat 2	Seat 3	Seat 4	Seat 5	Seat 6
1	1-6	Jan 4-Jan 10	Commentators III	Howard Lederer	Gabe Kaplan	Joe Sebok	Ali Nejad	Mark Gregorich	Kara Scott
2	7-12	Jan 11-Jan 17	Nicknames	Annette Obrestad	Mike Matusow	Antonio Esfandiari	Erick Lindgren	Phil Laak	Phil Hellmuth
3	13-18	Mar 15-Mar 21	Cash Game 50k, Part 1	Chris Ferguson	Phil Hellmuth	Antonio Esfandiari	Brandon Adams	Todd Brunson	Mike Matusow
4	19-24	Mar 22-Mar 28	Cash Game 50k, Part 2	Todd Brunson	Mike Matusow	Phil Hellmuth / Dennis Philips	Brandon Adams	Antonio Esfandiari	Chris Ferguson / David Peat
5	25-30	Apr 19-Apr 25	My Favorite Pro	Craig Ivey	James Ashby	Steve Bartlett	Phil Hellmuth	Jens Voertmann	Chris Ferguson
6	31-36	Apr 26-May 2	He Said, She Said	Erica Schoenberg	Jean-Robert Bellande	David Grey	Karina Jett	Mike Matusow	Annie Duke
7	37-42	Jun 7-Jun 13	Cash Game 100k, Part 1	Phil Hellmuth	Phil Laak	Eli Elezra	Tom Dwan	Doyle Brunson	Gus Hansen
8	43-48	Jun 14-Jun 20	Cash Game 100k, Part 2	Tom Dwan	Phil Laak	Doyle Brunson	Gus Hansen	Eli Elezra	Phil Hellmuth / David Peat
9	49-54	Aug 9-Aug 15	Lonesome Shark	Erick Lindgren	James Akenhead	Antonio Esfandiari	Mike Matusow	David Williams	Brad Booth
10	55-60	Aug 16-Aug 22	Mixed Martial Arts	Bruce Buffer	Patrik Antonius	Dan Henderson	Randy Couture	Howard Lederer	Erick Lindgren
11	61-66	Oct 4-Oct 10	Cash Game 150k, Part 1	Eli Elezra	Patrik Antonius	Alan Meltzer	Gabe Kaplan	David Peat	Tom Dwan
12	67-72	Oct 11-Oct 17	Cash Game 150k, Part 2	Gabe Kaplan	Tom Dwan	Patrik Antonius	David Peat	Alan Meltzer / Phil Laak	Eli Elezra
13	73-78	Dec 13-Dec 19	Charity In Mind	Phil Gordon	Chris Ferguson	Jennifer Harman	Howard Lederer	Andy Bloch	Annie Duke

- New graphics debuted with Season 6, including a notation of which player has the button. Previous seasons sometimes used a non-standard "first to act" graphic. Percentages to win the hand are shown more frequently than in past seasons, especially pre-flop, and a trailing player's outs are shown during all-in situations.
- Week 12 (Cash Game 150k, Part 2) - Phil Laak fills in for Alan Meltzer after Alan leaves mid-session.
- Phil Hellmuth appeared in the most weeks for the season with six appearances, while Mike Matusow appeared in five weeks.

=== Season 7 (2011) ===
Season 7 took place from the Aria Resort & Casino in Las Vegas, and was scheduled for 13 weeks of new episodes. The program was pulled from the schedule during this season after episode 48, and as a consequence weeks 9-13 never aired on NBC but are available on PokerGO.

Week	Episodes	Scheduled Airdates	Title	Seat 1	Seat 2	Seat 3	Seat 4	Seat 5	Seat 6
1	1-6	Jan 3-Jan 8	SNG 100k Freezeout	John Juanda	Erick Lindgren	Phil Galfond	Huck Seed	Tom Dwan	Phil Ivey
2	7-12	Feb 7-Feb 12	Cash Game 150k #2, Part 1	David Peat	Howard Lederer	Phil Laak	Greg Mueller	Olivier Busquet	Eli Elezra
3	13-18	Feb 14-Feb 19	Cash Game 150k #2, Part 2	Howard Lederer	Olivier Busquet	Greg Mueller	Phil Laak	David Peat	Eli Elezra
4	19-24	Apr 4-Apr 9	SNG 50k Idol Week	Andrew Lichtenberger	Eric Baldwin	Melanie Weisner	Doyle Brunson	Annette Obrestad	Tom Dwan
5	25-30	Apr 11-Apr 16	PLO 100k Cash Game, Part 1	Brandon Adams	Patrik Antonius	Phil Ivey	Tom Dwan	Brian Hastings	Phil Galfond
6	31-36	Apr 18-Apr 23	PLO 100k Cash Game, Part 2	Brian Hastings	Jared Bleznick	Tom Dwan	Phil Galfond	Phil Ivey	Patrik Antonius
7	37-42	Aug 01-Aug 05	Cash 100k min, Part 1	Mike Matusow	Jean-Robert Bellande	Peter Jetten	Brandon Adams	Chris Ferguson	Michael Mizrachi / Phil Hellmuth
8	43-48	Aug 08-Aug 12	Cash 100k min, Part 2	Brandon Adams	Chris Ferguson	Peter Jetten	Phil Hellmuth	Mike Matusow	Jean-Robert Bellande / Michael Mizrachi
9	49-54	Sep 5-Sep 10	Cash 100k min #2, Part 1	Annette Obrestad	Huck Seed	Antonio Esfandiari	Phil Hellmuth	Andy Bloch	Justin Smith
10	55-60	Sep 12-Sep 17	Cash 100k min #2, Part 2	Andy Bloch	Annette Obrestad	Justin Smith	Antonio Esfandiari	Phil Hellmuth	Huck Seed
11	61-66	Sep 19-Sep 24	SNG 20k Wish List	Mike Dappen	Phil Hellmuth	Mike Matusow	Chris Ferguson	Erica Schoenberg	Jennifer Harman
12	67-72	Nov 21-Nov 26	Cash 200k min, Part 1	David Peat	Eli Elezra	David Oppenheim	Patrik Antonius	Phil Ivey	Tom Dwan
13	73-78	Nov 28-Dec 3	Cash 200k min, Part 2	Tom Dwan	David Peat	Patrik Antonius	Phil Ivey	David Oppenheim	Eli Elezra

- Season 7 would see the second relocation of Poker After Dark as it moved from the Golden Nugget Las Vegas to Aria Resort & Casino.
- Previous to Season 7, the biggest buy-in sit-n-go was the $50,000 buy-in Week 8 (Mega Match) won by Allen Cunningham. In Season 7 there was both a $50,000 buy-in and a $100,000 buy-in sit-n-go won by Tom Dwan and Huck Seed respectively.
- Tom Dwan appeared in the most weeks for the season with six appearances, while Phil Hellmuth and Phil Ivey appeared in five weeks each.

=== Season 8 (2017) ===
Season 8 took place from inside the PokerGO Studio at ARIA Resort and Casino. Unlike the previous seven seasons, Season 8 would follow a new format of broadcasting live streams of each day of play, along with providing daily recaps of the action exclusively on PokerGO.

Week	Day	Scheduled Airdates	Title	Seat 1	Seat 2	Seat 3	Seat 4	Seat 5	Seat 6	Seat 7
1	1	August 14	The Return of Tom Dwan	Jean-Robert Bellande	Tom Dwan	Antonio Esfandiari	Lauren Roberts	Bill Klein	Daniel Negreanu	
	2	August 15	The Return of Tom Dwan	Tom Dwan	Andrew Robl	Doyle Brunson	Jean-Robert Bellande	Lauren Roberts	Bill Klein	
	3	August 16	The Return of Tom Dwan	Tom Dwan	Lauren Roberts	Andrew Robl	Bill Klein	Jean-Robert Bellande	Matt Kirk	
2	1	August 22	Voices Carry	David Williams	Mike Matusow	Matt Berkey	Jean-Robert Bellande	William Kassouf	Nick Schulman	
	2	August 23	Voices Carry	Jason Koon	Brian Rast	Nick Schulman	Matt Berkey	Scott Seiver	Ben Lamb	
	3	August 24	Voices Carry	Eric Worre	Greg Mueller	Jason Koon	Randall Emmett	Igor Kurganov	Liv Boeree	
3	1	September 5	Rumble with Jungle	Daniel Cates	Isaac Haxton	Brian Rast	Jason Koon	Frank Kassela	Jason Koon	
	2	September 6	Rumble with Jungle	Doug Polk	Jason Koon	Matt Berkey	Daniel Cates	Isaac Haxton	Brian Rast	
	3	September 7	Rumble with Jungle	Daniel Cates	Matt Berkey	Doug Polk	Jason Koon	Isaac Haxton	Brian Rast	
4	1	September 26	PLOMG	Brandon Adams	Brian Rast	Phil Galfond	Ben Lamb	Isaac Haxton	Daniel Cates	
	2	September 27	PLOMG	Brandon Adams	Isaac Haxton	Tom Dwan	Ben Lamb	Phil Galfond	Daniel Cates	
	3	September 28	PLOMG	Isaac Haxton	Daniel Cates	Chance Kornuth	Josh Arieh	Brandon Adams	Phil Galfond	
5	1	October 10	High Stakes Hybrid	Jason Koon	Mike Baxter	Doug Polk	Brian Rast	Lauren Roberts	Brandon Steven	Dan Shak
	2	October 11	High Stakes Hybrid	Doug Polk	Jason Koon	Mike Baxter	Dan Shak	Brian Rast	Brandon Steven	
6	1	October 17	Perks of the Trade	Brian Rast	Rick Salomon	Bill Perkins	Phil Galfond	Haralabos Voulgaris	Aaron Zang	
	2	October 18	Perks of the Trade	Haralabos Voulgaris	Brandon Adams / Matt Berkey	Daniel Cates	Rick Salomon	Aaron Zang	Bill Perkins	
	3	October 19	Perks of the Trade	Aaron Zang	Daniel Cates	Tom Marchese	Doug Polk	Bill Perkins		
7	1	November 20	Leave it to Seiver	Chris Kruk	Jacky Wang	Garrett Adelstein	Bob Bright	Scott Seiver	Matt Berkey / Allan Hu	Ben Lamb
	2	November 21	Leave it to Seiver	Scott Seiver	Jacky Wang	Matt Berkey	Ben Lamb	Chris Kruk	Bob Bright	Garrett Adelstein
8	1	November 28	Moon Magic	Jacky Wang	Antonio Esfandiari	Justin Young	Barry Woods	Lauren Roberts	Danielle Andersen	
	2	November 29	Moon Magic	Jacky Wang	Antonio Esfandiari	Justin Young	Danielle Andersen	Lauren Roberts	Barry Woods / Len Ashby	
9	1	December 12	Games of our Lives	Bob Bright	Farah Galfond	Jacky Wang	Bill Klein	Matt Berkey	Bill Perkins	
	2	December 13	Games of our Lives	Farah Galfond	Bill Klein	Bill Perkins	Matt Berkey	Bob Bright	Jean-Robert Bellande	
10	1	December 19	Holidays with Hellmuth	Dan Shak	Mike Matusow	Phil Hellmuth	Maria Ho	Antonio Esfandiari	Randall Emmett	
	2	December 20	Holidays with Hellmuth	David Sands	Avi Freedman	Phil Hellmuth	Brian Potashnik	Rick Thompson	Dan Shak	
	3	December 21	Holidays with Hellmuth	Phil Hellmuth	Joe Marchese	Doyle Brunson	Daniel Negreanu	Maria Ho	Dave Penski	

- Season 8 followed a new format for Poker After Dark of live-streaming the action on delay on PokerGO.
- Week 10 (Holidays with Hellmuth) would have two sit-n-goes that didn't have a winner-take-all format for the first time on Poker After Dark as both first and second places were paid.
- Matt Berkey appeared in the most weeks for the season with nine appearances, while Brian Rast and Daniel Cates appeared in eight nights each.

=== Season 9 (2018) ===
Season 9 was filmed inside the PokerGO Studio at ARIA Resort and Casino. Each day of play was live streamed exclusively on PokerGO and would be available on demand, along with daily recaps of the action.

Week	Day	Scheduled Airtimes	Title	Seat 1	Seat 2	Seat 3	Seat 4	Seat 5	Seat 6	Seat 7	Seat 8
1	1	January 3	Femme Fatale	Kitty Kuo	Melanie Weisner	J.J. Liu	Sofia Lovgren	Tracy Nguyen	Kristen Bicknell	Kathy Liebert	
	2	January 4	Femme Fatale	Kathy Liebert	Sofia Lovgren	Tracy Nguyen	Kristen Bicknell	Melanie Weisner	J.J. Liu		
2	1	January 16	The Prestige	Randall Emmett	Devon Chon Watt	Bob Sura	Darol Rodrock	Bill Perkins	Antonio Esfandiari	Robert Sanchez	Bob Nouri
	2	January 17	The Prestige	Devon Chon Watt	Bill Perkins	Darol Rodrock	Bob Nouri / Edwin Ting	Bob Sura	Robert Sanchez	Antonio Esfandiari	
3	1	January 25	Reality Check	Evan Sofer	Bob Bright	James Bord	Sean Dempsey	John Morgan	Nick Schulman	Maria Ho	Jean-Robert Bellande
	2	January 26	Reality Check	Frank Kassela	Nick Schulman	Jean-Robert Bellande	Bob Bright	Sean Dempsey	Maria Ho		
4	1	February 15	Dead Money	Garrett Adelstein	Sean Dempsey	Bob Bright	Jean-Robert Bellande	Matt Berkey	Stanley Choi		
	2	February 16	Dead Money	Stanley Choi	Matt Berkey	Garrett Adelstein	Billy O'Neil	Bob Bright	Jean-Robert Bellande	Sean Dempsey	
5	1	February 21	Talk the Talk	Jared Jaffee	Danielle Andersen	Antonio Esfandiari	Maurice Hawkins	Mickey Craft	Randall Emmett	Mike Dentale	
	2	February 22	Talk the Talk	Maurice Hawkins	Mickey Craft	Mike Dentale	Danielle Andersen	Jared Jaffee	Antonio Esfandiari	Justin Young	
6	1	March 6	Racks of Lamb	Keith Lehr	Matt Kirk	Ben Lamb	Jesse Sylvia	Chris MacFarland	Len Ashby		
	2	March 7	Racks of Lamb	Len Ashby	Gus Hansen	Sam Soverel	Ben Lamb	Brian Rast	Matt Kirk	Chris MacFarland	
7	1	March 14	Moving Violations	Bo Brownstein	Antonio Esfandiari	Jennifer Tilly	Don Cheadle	Nick Vertucci	John Morgan	Robert Sanchez	Randall Emmett
	2	March 15	Moving Violations	Don Cheadle	Jennifer Tilly	Randall Emmett	Nick Vertucci	Robert Sanchez	Antonio Esfandiari	John Morgan	
8	1	March 20	Whine and Cheese	Robert Kuhn	Jeremy Ausmus	Tom Marchese	Tracy Nguyen	Dan O'Brien	Justin Young	Hank Yang	Bob Bright
	2	March 21	Whine and Cheese	Jeremy Ausmus	Robert Kuhn	Bob Bright	Daniel Negreanu	Justin Young	Tom Marchese	Dan O'Brien / Hank Yang	Phil Hellmuth
9	1	May 15	Open House	Daniel Negreanu	Brandon Adams	Maria Ho	Larry Greenberg	Eli Elezra	Jeremy Kaufman	Alan Richardson	
	2	May 16	Open House	Mike Matusow	Tom Marchese	Don Nguyen	Phil Hellmuth	Bill Perkins	Antonio Esfandiari	Matt Berkey	Dan Shak
10	1	August 1	Solve for Hollywood	Jacky Wang	Randall Emmett	Garrett Adelstein	Dave Peters	Don Nguyen	Matt Berkey	Farah Galfond	
	2	August 2	Solve for Hollywood	Matt Berkey	Tracy Nguyen	Garrett Adelstein	Dave Peters	Jacky Wang	Farah Galfond		
11	1	August 14	Rise and Grind	Alan Richardson	Michael Mizrachi	Justin Young	John Cynn	Vitalyi Rizhkov	Farah Galfond	Bob Bright	
	2	August 15	Rise and Grind	Ronny Beda	Alan Richardson	Farah Galfond	Bob Bright	Vitalyi Rizhkov	Maria Ho	Michael Mizrachi / Chris Johnson	John Cynn
12	1	August 21	Masters of the Main	Scott Vener	Kelly Minkin	Tony Miles	Mickey Craft	Scott Blumstein	John Cynn	Randall Emmett	Ben Lamb
	2	August 22	Masters of the Main	Scott Vener / Bob Bright	John Cynn	Ben Lamb	Mickey Craft / Jay Farber	Jeremy Ausmus	Kelly Minkin	Randall Emmett / Jared Jaffee	Scott Blumstein / Jacky Wang
13	1	August 28	Under the Gun	Daniel Weinand	Robert Sanchez	Phil Hellmuth	Jennifer Tilly	Eli Elezra	Jean-Robert Bellande	Randall Emmett	
	2	August 29	Under the Gun	Norm Macdonald / Alan Richardson	Jean-Robert Bellande	Daniel Weinand	Jennifer Tilly	Phil Hellmuth	Eli Elezra	Randall Emmett / Jeremy Ausmus	Robert Sanchez
14	1	September 25	Big Three	Jonathan Depa	Isaac Haxton	Justin Ligeri	Brandon Adams	Ryan Tosoc	Ben Lamb		
	2	September	Big Three	Jonathan Depa	Ryan Tosoc	Isaac Haxton	Brandon Adams	Justin Young	Ben Lamb	Sam Soverel	
15	1	October 9	Power Play	Nick Schulman	John Morgan	Daniel Negreanu	Jean-Robert Bellande	Bill Klein	Bob Bright	Justin Young	
	2	October 10	Power Play	Jeremy Ausmus	Justin Young	John Morgan	Nick Schulman	Bob Bright	Bill Klein	Daniel Negreanu	
16	1	October 23	Godfather	Scott Seiver	Brian Rast	Billy O'Neil	Bryn Kenney	Doyle Brunson	Jared Bleznick	Gus Hansen	
	2	October 24	Godfather	Daniel Cates	Billy O'Neil	Jared Bleznick	Doyle Brunson	Gus Hansen	Brian Rast	Scott Seiver	
17	1	November 5	888poker Week	Eli Elezra	Chris Moorman	Peter Martin	Jennifer Tilly	Kelly Minkin	Bill Klein	Maria Ho	
	2	November 6	888poker Week	Chris Moorman	Eli Elezra	Jennifer Tilly	Bill Klein	Maria Ho	Kelly Minkin	Otto Richard	
18	1	November 13	Magic Moments	Nick Varano	Bo Brownstein	Roger Sippl	Antonio Esfandiari	Jennifer Tilly	Liron Ben Shimon		
	2	November 14	Magic Moments	Antonio Esfandiari	Liron Ben Shimon	Jennifer Tilly	Roger Sippl	Nick Varano	Bo Brownstein		
19	1	November 26	Dolly's Game	Farzad Bonyadi	Frank Kassela	Daniel Alaei	Shawn Sheikhan	Billy Baxter	Majid Yahyaei	Doyle Brunson	
20	1	November 27	Norm Plays Poker	Sean Dempsey	Norm Macdonald	Nick Schulman	Frank Kassela	Eli Elezra	Alan Richardson	Keith Lehr	
21	1	December 3	Pro Bono	Sam Soverel	Danny Aharoni	Justin Bonomo	Anthony Alberto	Ben Lamb	Jonathan Depa		
	2	December 4	Pro Bono	Anthony Alberto	Ben Lamb	Jonathan Depa	Justin Bonomo	Danny Aharoni	Keith Lehr	Sam Soverel	

- Season 9 would feature the most weeks in a season of Poker After Dark with 21. The most before that was 13 weeks in Seasons 5–7.
- In September 2020, PokerGO launched Poker After Dark Studio Cuts which would see live streams cut into episodes. Power Play was one of the shows cut into Studio Cuts with each night of play split into three episodes each.
- Week 9 (Open House) was the first time Poker After Dark would be filmed inside the PokerGO Studio.
- Season 9 would be the first time a game other than No-Limit Hold'em or Pot-Limit Omaha was played. Week 14 (Big Three) featured a three-game rotation of No-Limit Hold'em, Pot-Limit Omaha, and No-Limit 2-7 Single Draw. Week 16 (Godfather) was a H.O.R.S.E. and 2-7 Triple Draw rotation. Week 19 (Dolly's Game) was No-Limit 2-7 Single Draw. Week 21 (Pro Bono) was Short Deck.
- Week 17 (888poker Week) was a $10,000 buy-in sit-n-go. Day 1 was won by Maria Ho, and Day 2 was won by Eli Elezra.
- Bob Bright appeared on 11 shows, ahead of Antonio Esfandiari and Randall Emmett on nine each, and Ben Lamb and Jennifer Tilly on eight each.

=== Season 10 (2019) ===
Season 10 was filmed inside the PokerGO Studio at ARIA Resort and Casino. Each day of play was live-streamed exclusively on PokerGO and would be available on-demand, along with daily recaps of the action.

Week	Day	Scheduled Airdates	Title	Seat 1	Seat 2	Seat 3	Seat 4	Seat 5	Seat 6	Seat 7	Seat 8
1	1	January 22	$25K Elevator	Sean Winter	Adrian Attenborough	Justin Young	Anthony Alberto	Ralph Wong	Matt Berkey	Chris Hunichen	
	2	January 23	$25K Elevator	Justin Young	Sean Winter	Anthony Alberto	Adrian Attenborough	Ralph Wong	Matt Berkey		
2	1	March 25	Femme Fatale II	Danielle Andersen	Kitty Kuo	Farah Galfond	Elica Lemann	Kym Lim	Denise Pratt		
	2	March 26	Femme Fatale II	Maria Ho	Denise Pratt	Kym Lim	Elica Lemann	Danielle Andersen	Farah Galfond	Lily Kiletto	Kitty Kuo
3	1	April 8	Run It Once	George James	Dylan Linde	Kevin Rabichow	Dave Eldridge	Joey Ingram	Seth Davies		
	2	April 9	Run It Once	Phil Galfond	Kevin Rabichow	George James	Elica Lemann	Randall Emmett	Dylan Linde	Joey Ingram	
4	1	April 25	Golden Nights	Alex Haro	Jamie Gold	Farah Galfond	Randall Emmett	Frank Kassela	Drew Donen	Anthony Alberto	
	2	April 26	Golden Nights	Jamie Gold	Frank Kassela	Farah Galfond	Alex Haro	Daniel Negreanu	Randall Emmett	Drew Donen	Paul Martino
5	1	May 21	888poker Week II	Randall Emmett	Mark Heintz	Jennifer Tilly	Phil Hellmuth	Dominik Nitsche	Chris Moorman	Ali Imsirovic	
	2	May 22	888poker Week II	Randall Emmett	Eli Elezra	Jennifer Tilly	Ali Imsirovic	Phil Hellmuth	Dominik Nitsche	Chris Moorman	
6	1	July 22	Main Event Hangover	Hossein Ensan	Vivian Saliba	Jamie Kerstetter	Brandon Cantu	Dario Sammartino	Matt Berkey	Mike Matusow	
	2	July 23	Main Event Hangover	Matt Berkey	Randall Emmett	Mike Matusow	Anthony Marquez	Sam Soverel	Brandon Cantu	Hossein Ensan	Vivian Saliba
7	1	August 6	Open Seat	Jeff Platt	Trevor Savage	Barry Woods	Mike Matusow	Justin Young	Brandon Cantu	Brandon Schaefer	
	2	August 7	Open Seat	Brandon Schaefer	Brandon Cantu	Trevor Savage	Barry Woods	Mike Matusow	Jeff Platt	Justin Young	
8	1	August 20	GOAT Week	Paul Pierce	Mike Sexton	Rob Yong	Jennifer Tilly	Phil Hellmuth	Randall Emmett	Alan Keating	
	2	August 21	GOAT Week	Tom Dwan	Paul Pierce / Brandon Cantu	Alan Keating	Jennifer Tilly	Rob Yong	Phil Hellmuth	Randall Emmett	
9	1	September 24	Hellmuth's Home Game	David Sacks	Jason Calacanis	Chamath Palihapitiya	Phil Hellmuth	Draymond Green / Brandon Cantu	Maria Ho	Rick Thompson	
	2	September 25	Hellmuth's Home Game	Rick Thompson	Maria Ho	Brandon Cantu	Jason Calacanis	Phil Hellmuth	Chamath Palihapitiya	David Sacks	
10	1	October 8	Run It Up Week	Ricky Guan	Jamie Kerstetter	Marle Cordeiro	Nathan Manuel	Pat Carter	Jason Somerville	Mark Mazza	
	2	October 9	Run It Up Week	Nathan Manuel	Pat Carter	Jamie Kerstetter	Johnny Vibes	Ricky Guan	Jason Somerville	Mark Mazza	
11	1	October 23	Showbound!	Norm Macdonald	Maria Ho	Wadih Kaawar	Garry Gates	Jamie Gold	Jamie Kerstetter	Chance Kornuth	
	2	October 24	Showbound!	Chance Kornuth	Sam Simmons	Garry Gates	Jamie Kerstetter	Clyde Lorance	Jamie Gold	Jeff Platt	
12	1	December 3	Whales vs. Wizards	Tom Schwartz	Kitty Kuo	Justin Young	Ali Imsirovic	Anthony Alberto	Dominik Nitsche	Randall Emmett	
	2	December 4	Whales vs. Wizards	Randall Emmett	Dominik Nitsche	Tom Schwartz / Dan Shak	Justin Young	Kitty Kuo	Ali Imsirovic	Tim Sharif	
13	1	December 19	Holidays with Hellmuth II	Jon Ferraro	Phil Hellmuth	James Bord	Jennifer Tilly	Brandon Cantu	Rob Yong	Randall Emmett	

- Season 10 would be the first season of Poker After Dark filmed entirely in the PokerGO Studio at ARIA Resort & Casino.
- In September 2020, PokerGO launched Poker After Dark Studio Cuts which would see live streams cut into episodes. GOAT week was one of the shows cut into Studio Cuts with each night of play split into three episodes each.
- Week 5 (888poker Week II) was a $10,000 buy-in sit-n-go. Day 1 was won by Ali Imsirovic, and Day 2 was won by Chris Moorman.
- Week 11 (Showbound!) was a $5,000 buy-in sit-n-go. Day 1 was won by Maria Ho, and Day 2 was won by Garry Gates.
- Week 12 (Whales vs. Wizards) included a $5,000 buy-in sit-n-go with one rebuy allowed. Justin Young was the winner.
- Randall Emmett appeared on 11 shows, ahead of Brandon Cantu on eight, and Phil Hellmuth on seven.

=== Season 11 (2020) ===
Season 11 was filmed inside the PokerGO Studio at ARIA Resort & Casino. Each day of play was live-streamed exclusively on PokerGO and would be available on-demand, along with daily recaps of the action. Season 11 was cut short due to the COVID-19 pandemic and only featured two weeks of play.

Week	Day	Scheduled Airdates	Title	Seat 1	Seat 2	Seat 3	Seat 4	Seat 5	Seat 6	Seat 7
1	1	January 16	One Night in Vegas	Albert Daher	Mike Matusow	Freddy Deeb	Nick Schulman	Daniel Negreanu	Frank Stepuchin	Eli Elezra
2	1	February 26	Lucky Charms Week	Doc Barry	David Silverman	Jennifer Tilly	Mike Shaheen	Antonio Esfandiari	Evan Mathis	
	2	February 27	Lucky Charms Week	Bob Bounahra	Bill Perkins	Julie Yorn	Jennifer Tilly	David Silverman	Evan Mathis	Antonio Esfandiari

- In September 2020, PokerGO launched Poker After Dark Studio Cuts which would see live streams cut into episodes. One Night in Vegas was one of the shows cut into Studio Cuts with the lone night of play split into two episodes.
- Antonio Esfandiari, David Silverman, Evan Mathis, and Jennifer Tilly each appeared on two shows each.

=== Season 12 (2020-21) ===
Season 12 was filmed inside the PokerGO Studio at ARIA Resort & Casino. After each day of play being live-streamed on PokerGO for seasons 8 to 11, Poker After Dark returned to an episodic format released weekly for Season 12.

Week	Episodes	Scheduled Airdates	Title	Seat 1	Seat 2	Seat 3	Seat 4	Seat 5	Seat 6	Seat 7
1	1-3	Dec. 13, 20, 27	Cry Me a River	Alex Ding	Scott Ball	Andrew Sasson	Damien LeForbes	Antonio Esfandiari	Ben Lamb	Justin Young
2	4-7	Jan. 4, 11, 18, 25	The Bratty Bunch	David Sacks	Jason Calacanis	Phil Hellmuth	Bill Gurley	Chamath Palihapitiya	Alan Keating	
3	8-10	Feb. 1, 8, 15	The Fantastic Five	Lynne Ji	Matt Berkey	James Romero	Jake Daniels	Sam Soverel		
4	11-12	Feb. 22, Mar. 1	One Bourbon, One Shot, and No Fear	Sam Soverel	Jake Daniels	Chris Johnson	Jonathan Little	Alex Ding	Justin Young	
5	13-14	Mar. 8, 15	Lesson Learned	Jonathan Little	James Romero	Matt Affleck	Brad Owen	Faraz Jaka	Justin Saliba	
6	15-16	Mar. 22, 29	Not About Nick	Matt Berkey	Terry Fleischer	Nick Schulman	James Bord	Scott Ball	Jeremiah Williams	
7	17-18	Apr. 5, 12	Blitz Week	Bill Perkins	Steve Aoki	Mally Mall	Dan Bilzerian	Chris Eubank Jr.	Lara Sebastian	David Bell
8	19-21	Apr. 19, 26, May 3	Watch Your Step	Ilyas Abayev	Alex Ding	Ronnie Bardah	Frank Stepuchin	Marle Cordeiro	Alan Richardson	
8	22-24	May 10, 17, 24	Watch Your Step	Landon Tice	Frank Stepuchin	Ilyas Abeyev	Marle Cordeiro	Mike Matusow	Alex Ding	Ronnie Bardah
9	25-26	May 31, June 7	Gamblers Delight	Dan Shak	James Bord	Lynne Ji	Albert Destrade	Jake Daniels	Trevor Pope	Bryan Ercolano
9	27-29	June 14, 21, 28	Gamblers Delight	Bryan Ercolano	Albert Destrade	Lynne Ji	Trevor Pope	Jake Daniels	Dan Shak	

- Season 12 of Poker After Dark returned to an episodic format that aired on Sunday evenings for Week 1 (Cry Me a River), before switching to Monday evenings for Week 2 (The Bratty Bunch) onwards.
- Veronica Brill was introduced as the sideline reporter for Season 12.
- Week 5 (Lesson Learned) was a $5,000 buy-in sit-n-go. James Romero defeated Matt Affleck and won $30,000.
- Alex Ding and Jake Daniels both appeared in three weeks each.

=== Season 13 (2021) ===
Season 13 was filmed inside the PokerGO Studio at ARIA Resort & Casino. Episodes were released weekly on Mondays for Season 13.

Week	Episodes	Scheduled Airdates	Title	Seat 1	Seat 2	Seat 3	Seat 4	Seat 5	Seat 6	Seat 7	Seat 8
1	1-3	July 19, 26, Aug. 2	The Nosebleeds	Jake Daniels	Zach Franzi	Daniel Negreanu	Matt Berkey	Dan Smith	MJ Gonzales	Scott Seiver	
2	4	Aug. 9	Action Arden	Ben Yerushalaim	Arden Cho	Julie Yorn	Phil Hellmuth	Ryan Feldman	Steven Dang	Danielle Andersen	Jeremy Levin
3	5-7	Aug. 16, 23, 30	Feeding Franzi	Nick Wright	Zach Franzi	Joelle Parenteau	Hish Salama	Daniel Weinand	Eli Elezra	Maria Ho	
4	8-10	Sept. 6, 13, 20	Fight Night	Bruce Buffer	Peter Jennings	Maria Ho	Phil Hellmuth	Nick Wright	Daniel Negreanu	Jon Aguiar	
5	11-12	Sept. 27, Oct. 4	Everything in its Wright Place	Landon Tice	Nick Wright	Phil Hellmuth	Melissa Schubert	Eli Elezra	Ema Zajmović	Alan Richardson	
6	13-15		Let Them Play	Alexandra Botez	MrBeast	Phil Hellmuth	Doyle Brunson	Clay Travis	Graham Stephan	Ted Cruz	

- Veronica Brill continued as the sideline reporter for Season 13.
- Week 4 (Fight Night) was a $10,000 buy-in sit-n-go. Nick Wright defeated Phil Hellmuth and won $50,000.
- Week 6 (Let Them Play) aired on GGPoker's YouTube channel.

== Results and notes ==
Results from cash game weeks, which Poker After Dark introduced in Season 4 and continued in Season 5, Season 6, and Season 7, are also omitted.

=== Season 1 (2007) ===
Week	Title	6th Place	5th Place	4th Place	3rd Place	Runner-up	Winner
1	Poker Brat Attack	Phil Hellmuth	Steve Zolotow	Shawn Sheikhan	Annie Duke	Huck Seed	Gus Hansen
2	Play Anything	Jerry Buss	Doyle Brunson	Gabe Kaplan	Mike Matusow	David Grey	Daniel Negreanu
3	WSOP Champions	Carlos Mortensen	Jamie Gold	Doyle Brunson	Chris Ferguson	Chris Moneymaker	Johnny Chan
4	Earphones Please	Sam Farha	Phil Hellmuth	Andy Bloch	Tony G	Mike Matusow	Phil Ivey
5	Phil Phil	Doyle Brunson	Erik Seidel	Phil Hellmuth	Jennifer Harman	Antonio Esfandiari	Phil Laak
6	Talking Heads	Chad Brown	Michael Konik	Mike Sexton	Gabe Kaplan	Phil Gordon	Howard Lederer
7	Against All Odds	Sam Farha	Ted Forrest	Clonie Gowen	Gus Hansen	Tony G	Chris Ferguson
8	Killer Table	Erick Lindgren	Phil Gordon	Jennifer Tilly	Phil Ivey	Patrik Antonius	Jennifer Harman
9	Loose Lips	Barry Greenstein	Mike Matusow	David Benyamine	Shawn Sheikhan	Allen Cunningham	John Juanda
10	Ladies' Week	Vanessa Rousso	Evelyn Ng	Dee Luong	Cyndy Violette	Jennifer Harman	Clonie Gowen

- In the third episode of Week 1, the players continued to talk and make noise while Phil Hellmuth was trying to decide whether to go all-in against Annie Duke. Hellmuth held A♥ 10♦, while Duke had K♠ K♥. The lack of decorum caused Hellmuth to lash out at Shawn Sheikhan, call over the show's executive producer, and leave the table. Hellmuth also threatened not to participate in future Poker After Dark tournaments unless the show implemented a rule that encouraged people to stop talking when a player is making an important decision. Immediately after the incident, producers put in place a rule which states that if a player wishes to have silence at the table when faced with a tough decision, the player need only inform the dealer, who will then notify the other players of the request. Failure to comply will result in a "time-out" period of one lap of the button for the offending player(s), with blinds forfeited during this time.

=== Season 2 (2007) ===
Week	Title	6th Place	5th Place	4th Place	3rd Place	Runner-up	Winner
1	Golden Men	Greg Raymer	Jamie Gold	Huck Seed	Doyle Brunson	Johnny Chan	Joe Hachem
2	International	Gus Hansen	Daniel Negreanu	Marco Traniello	David Benyamine	Brad Booth	Patrik Antonius
3	Queens and Kings	Ali Nejad	Annie Duke	Vanessa Rousso	Howard Lederer	Kristy Gazes	Gabe Kaplan
4	World Series Legends	Chris Ferguson	Layne Flack	Erik Seidel	T.J. Cloutier	Phil Hellmuth	Doyle Brunson
5	WPT All-Stars	Michael Mizrachi	Erick Lindgren	Daniel Negreanu	Gus Hansen	Tuan Le	Howard Lederer
6	Live To Hurt	Mike Matusow	Daniel Negreanu	Phil Hellmuth	Antonio Esfandiari	Phil Laak	Shawn Sheikhan
7	Poker Prowess	Phil Laak	Andy Bloch	David Williams	Annie Duke	John Juanda	Clonie Gowen
8	Mega Match	David Benyamine	Jennifer Harman	Barry Greenstein	Phil Ivey	Eli Elezra	Allen Cunningham
9	Of Mouth and Men	Mike Matusow	Alan Boston	Antonio Esfandiari	Paul Wasicka	Jamie Gold	Mike Sexton
10	Signature Week	Jennifer Harman	Gus Hansen	Chris Ferguson	Phil Hellmuth	Howard Lederer	Phil Ivey

- In "International" week, Gus Hansen was knocked out after six hands, and heads-up play started after 53 hands, both record lows for the show.

=== Season 3 (2008) ===
Week	Title	6th Place	5th Place	4th Place	3rd Place	Runner-up	Winner
1	Dream Table	Mike Matusow	Daniel Negreanu	Scotty Nguyen	Ken Light	Jennifer Harman	Phil Hellmuth
2	19th Hole	David Oppenheim	Erick Lindgren	Daniel Negreanu	Doyle Brunson	Phil Ivey	Gavin Smith
3	Hecklers	Mike Matusow	Sam Grizzle	Gavin Smith	Jean-Robert Bellande	Shawn Sheikhan	Phil Hellmuth
4	World Champions	Huck Seed	Chris Ferguson	Berry Johnston	Jamie Gold	Phil Hellmuth	Johnny Chan
5	Cowboys	Hoyt Corkins	Doyle Brunson	Chau Giang	Chris Ferguson	Andy Bloch	Gabe Kaplan
6	International	Daniel Negreanu	John Juanda	Gus Hansen	Roland De Wolfe	Patrik Antonius	Johnny Chan
7	Jam Up	Barry Greenstein	Mike Matusow	Eli Elezra	Howard Lederer	Antonio Esfandiari	David Williams
8	Gus & Ladies	J. J. Liu	Gus Hansen	Erica Schoenberg	Beth Shak	Clonie Gowen	Vanessa Rousso
9	Love at First Raise	Erica Schoenberg	Phil Laak	Jennifer Harman	Jennifer Tilly	Marco Traniello	David Benyamine
10	Commentators	Howard Lederer	Phil Gordon	Robert Williamson III	Chad Brown	Ali Nejad	Mark Gregorich

- "Dream Table" week featured a Poker After Dark first: Phil Hellmuth won by calling an all-in bet from both Ken Light and Jen Harman on the last hand, resulting in the first match to end with no heads-up play.
- "Hecklers Week" featured a controversial situation which necessitated the producer having to come to the table. Phil Hellmuth attempted to bluff the river with pair of aces on the board in a hand against Jean-Robert Bellande, and Bellande called. Hellmuth then said "you got it" and held onto his cards, waiting for Bellande to show the winner. Bellande felt he did not have to show his hand, while Hellmuth thought "olden day etiquette" indicated that he should. The tournament was stopped for 5 minutes while all players voiced their opinions and eventually the producer came over and then Hellmuth showed his hand, necessitating that Bellande show his to claim the pot.
- "Jam Up" week featured a rule that allowed any player knocked out over the first six hands (once around the table) to rebuy. On the first hand, Eli Elezra was knocked out when his AK didn't crack Howard Lederer's AA when they both got all their chips in pre-flop. Eli was allowed to rebuy for another $20,000, which brought the total chips in play to $140,000, and the first place prize to $140,000.
- The "Best Of" episode that closed Season 5 featured Elezra's knockout on the first hand of Jam Up week, but did not make clear that he was able to rebuy after busting out on the first hand per that week's rules, and insinuated he was eliminated.

=== Season 4 (2008) ===
Weeks 1 and 7 were Cash Games #1 and #2, and are omitted from the results table.

Week	Title	6th Place	5th Place	4th Place	3rd Place	Runner-up	Winner
2	Nets Vs. Vets	Andrew Robl	Johnny Chan	Tom Dwan	Huck Seed	Doyle Brunson	Brian Townsend
3	Heads Up Challenge	Not Applicable		Paul Wasicka	Ted Forrest	Chris Ferguson	Phil Hellmuth
4	Mission Impossible	David Williams	Gavin Smith	Mike Matusow	Phil Hellmuth	Phil Laak	Clonie Gowen
5	Dream II	Mike Sexton	Mike Matusow	Paul Featherstone	Jennifer Harman	Phil Hellmuth	Gavin Smith
6	Mayfair Club	Dan Harrington	Mike Shichtman	Steve Zolotow	Mickey Appleman	Howard Lederer	Jay Heimowitz

- The Heads Up Challenge used a double-elimination format. In the opening round, Chris Ferguson defeated Paul Wasicka and Phil Hellmuth defeated Ted Forrest. Hellmuth then defeated Ferguson to move on to the final, while Forrest's win against Wasicka eliminated Wasicka. Facing off with one loss each, Ferguson defeated Forrest to set up a Hellmuth-Ferguson final, where Hellmuth only needed to win one out of two matches while Ferguson needed to sweep both matches. Ferguson won the opener before Hellmuth won the finale. In each of Hellmuth's wins against Ferguson, he had pocket tens on the final hand.

=== Season 5 (2009) ===
Seven of the 16 weeks during season 5—Weeks 4, 7, 8, 11, 12, 15, 16—were cash games, and are omitted from the results table.

Week	Title	6th Place	5th Place	4th Place	3rd Place	Runner-up	Winner
1	Close but no Cigar	David Williams	Dewey Tomko	Allen Cunningham	Lee Watkinson	Andy Black	Mike Matusow
2	Speak Your Mind	Phil Hellmuth	Todd Brunson	Gabe Kaplan	David Grey	Cory Zeidman	Phil Gordon
3	Brilliant Minds	David Sklansky	Bill Chen	Brandon Adams	Jimmy Warren	Chris Ferguson	Andy Bloch
5	Dream Table III	Mike Matusow	Daniel Negreanu	Phil Laak	Arnold Thimons	Jennifer Tilly	Johnny Chan
6	International III	David Benyamine	John Phan	Brad Booth	Allen Cunningham	Ivan Demidov	John Juanda
9	Sit-n-Talk	Mike Matusow	Antonio Esfandiari	Jean-Robert Bellande	Jennifer Harman	David Grey	Vanessa Rousso
10	Celebrities and Mentors	Jason Alexander	Orel Hershiser	Phil Gordon	Barry Greenstein	Don Cheadle	Gavin Smith
13	Magnificent Six	Howard Lederer	Phil Ivey	Doyle Brunson	Daniel Negreanu	Phil Hellmuth	Chris Ferguson
14	USA vs. Italy	Marco Traniello	Chris Ferguson	Max Pescatori	Erick Lindgren	Dario Minieri	Howard Lederer

- Season 5 started with three veteran Poker After Dark players securing their first PAD wins (Matusow, Gordon and Bloch).
- In Celebrities and Mentors, the mentor-celebrity relationships were Greenstein-Alexander, Smith-Hershiser and Gordon-Cheadle.
- Chris Ferguson had lost six times, including the Season 4 Heads-Up Challenge, before his Magnificent Six win became his first win since Season 1.
- Howard Lederer became the first player to place last one week, and win the next week.

=== Season 6 (2010) ===
Six of the 13 weeks during season 6—Weeks 3, 4, 7, 8, 11, and 12—were cash games, and are omitted from the results table.

Week	Title	6th Place	5th Place	4th Place	3rd Place	Runner-up	Winner
1	Commentators III	Kara Scott	Ali Nejad	Mark Gregorich	Howard Lederer	Joe Sebok	Gabe Kaplan
2	Nicknames	Erick Lindgren	Annette Obrestad	Mike Matusow	Phil Hellmuth	Antonio Esfandiari	Phil Laak
5	My Favorite Pro	Chris Ferguson	James Ashby	Steve Bartlett	Craig Ivey	Phil Hellmuth	Jens Voertmann
6	He Said, She Said	Erica Schoenberg	Jean-Robert Bellande	David Grey	Annie Duke	Mike Matusow	Karina Jett
9	Lonesome Shark	Erick Lindgren	Antonio Esfandiari	Brad Booth	Mike Matusow	David Williams	James Akenhead
10	Mixed Martial Arts	Patrik Antonius	Randy Couture	Erick Lindgren	Dan Henderson	Bruce Buffer	Howard Lederer
13	Charity In Mind	Howard Lederer	Chris Ferguson	Jennifer Harman	Annie Duke	Andy Bloch	Phil Gordon

- Gabe Kaplan's win in Commentators III week marked the greatest comeback in Poker After Dark history.
- Phil Laak's win in Nicknames week marked the first time a single player has won two Poker After Dark titles against the same opponent heads-up (he won both of his titles against Antonio Esfandiari, the first being in Phil Phil week from Season 1).
- The My Favorite Pro tournament marked the first time every episode of play ended in an elimination.

=== Season 7 (2011) ===
As of April 9, 2011, 2 of the 4 weeks aired from season 6 were cash games, and are omitted from the results table. Week 11 wasn't originally aired on NBC, but are now available on PokerGO.

Week	Title	6th Place	5th Place	4th Place	3rd Place	Runner-Up	Winner
1	SNG $100k Freezeout	John Juanda	Erick Lindgren	Phil Galfond	Tom Dwan	Phil Ivey	Huck Seed
4	SNG $50k Freezeout	Doyle Brunson	Annette Obrestad	Andrew Lichtenberger	Melanie Weisner	Eric Baldwin	Tom Dwan
11	SNG $20k Wish List	Mike Matusow	Mike Dappen	Erica Schoenberg	Jennifer Harman	Phil Hellmuth	Chris Ferguson

- In week 4, Tom Dwan came back from below 40k in chips early to knock out both Andrew Lichtenberger and Melanie Weisner while trailing preflop both times, to finally finish the match against Eric Baldwin, again trailing preflop.

=== Season 8 (2017) ===
Only 3 weeks during Season 8 featured a high stakes sit & go, other episodes featured cash games and are omitted from the results table.

Week	Title	6th Place	5th Place	4th Place	3rd Place	Runner-up	Winner
2	Voices Carry	Jean-Robert Bellande	David Williams	William Kassouf	Mike Matusow	Nick Schulman	Matt Berkey
2	Voices Carry	Scott Seiver	Jason Koon	Brian Rast	Matt Berkey	Nick Schulman	Ben Lamb
2	Voices Carry	Eric Worre	Igor Kurganov	Greg Mueller	Jason Koon	Randall Emmett	Liv Boeree
3	Rumble with Jungle	Isaac Haxton	Doug Polk	Daniel Cates	Frank Kassela	Brian Rast	Jason Koon
10	Holidays with Hellmuth	Mike Matusow	Dan Shak	Randall Emmett	Antonio Esfandiari	Phil Hellmuth	Maria Ho
10	Holidays with Hellmuth	Doyle Brunson	Joseph Marchese	David Penski	Maria Ho	Daniel Negreanu	Phil Hellmuth

=== Season 9 (2018) ===
Only 1 week during Season 9 featured a high stakes sit & go, other episodes featured cash games and are omitted from the results table.

Week	Title	7th Place	6th Place	5th Place	4th Place	3rd Place	Runner-up	Winner
17	888poker	Chris Moorman	Jennifer Tilly	Kelly Minkin	Peter Martin	Bill Klein	Eli Elezra	Maria Ho
17	888poker	Maria Ho	Bill Klein	Chris Moorman	Kelly Minkin	Jennifer Tilly	Otto Richard	Eli Elezra

=== Season 10 (2019) ===
Only 3 weeks during Season 10 featured a high stakes sit & go, other episodes featured cash games and are omitted from the results table.

Week	Title	7th Place	6th Place	5th Place	4th Place	3rd Place	Runner-up	Winner
5	888poker II	Dominik Nitsche	Jennifer Tilly	Mark Heintz	Randall Emmett	Chris Moorman	Phil Hellmuth	Ali Imsirovic
5	888poker II	Jennifer Tilly	Phil Hellmuth	Dominik Nitsche	Eli Elezra	Randall Emmett	Ali Imsirovic	Chris Moorman
11	Showbound!	Norm Macdonald	Garry Gates	Jamie Kerstetter	Jamie Gold	Woody Kaawar	Chance Kornuth	Maria Ho
11	Showbound!	Jeff Platt	Jamie Kerstetter	Jamie Gold	Clyde Lorance	Chance Kornuth	Sam Simmons	Garry Gates
12	Whales vs. Wizards	Randall Emmett	Ali Imsirovic	Dominik Nitsche	Anthony Alberto	Tom Schwartz	Kitty Kuo	Justin Young

=== Season 11 (2020) ===
Season 11 was cut short due to the COVID-19 pandemic and only featured two weeks which were both cash games.

=== Season 12 (2021) ===
Only 1 week during Season 12 featured a high stakes sit & go, other episodes featured cash games and are omitted from the results table.

Week	Title	6th Place	5th Place	4th Place	3rd Place	Runner-up	Winner
5	Lesson Learned	Brad Owen	Jonathan Little	Justin Saliba	Faraz Jaka	Matt Affleck	James Romero

=== Season 13 (2021) ===
Only 1 week during Season 13 featured a high stakes sit & go, other episodes featured cash games and are omitted from the results table.

Week	Title	7th Place	6th Place	5th Place	4th Place	3rd Place	Runner-up	Winner
4	Fight Night	Maria Ho	Bruce Buffer	Daniel Negreanu	Jon Aguiar	Peter Jennings	Phil Hellmuth	Nick Wright

== Reception ==
In the U.S., the show had some early ratings success: during season one's second week, it attracted on average a larger audience among adults 18-34 than The Late Late Show with Craig Ferguson did the same week, even though the latter is broadcast 90 minutes earlier.

== Sponsorship ==
Full Tilt Poker regularly advertised during Poker After Dark broadcasts, and in some countries, Full Tilt Poker is included in the show's title, which for a time prompted players associated with a rival site (Poker Stars) to stop appearing on the show. Full Tilt Poker held promotional tournaments that offered a seat on the show as the grand prize. The first of these winners, Ken Light, appeared in the first week of Season 3, and was said to have picked his own opponents, though Light later said on the show itself that he was only asked to provide a list of his favorite players and that he did not know that players from the list would join him on the show.

== See also ==
- List of television shows set in Las Vegas
- World Series of Poker
- National Heads-Up Poker Championship
- High Stakes Poker
