= David Oppenheim =

David Oppenheim may refer to:

- David Oppenheim (musician) (1922–2007), American clarinetist and producer
- David Oppenheim (poker player) (born 1973), American poker player
- David Oppenheim (rabbi) (1664–1736), chief rabbi of Prague
- David Oppenheim (actor) (2012–now)
- Dave Oppenheim, founder of Opcode Systems
