= Kara Scott =

Canadian British television personality, journalist, and poker player

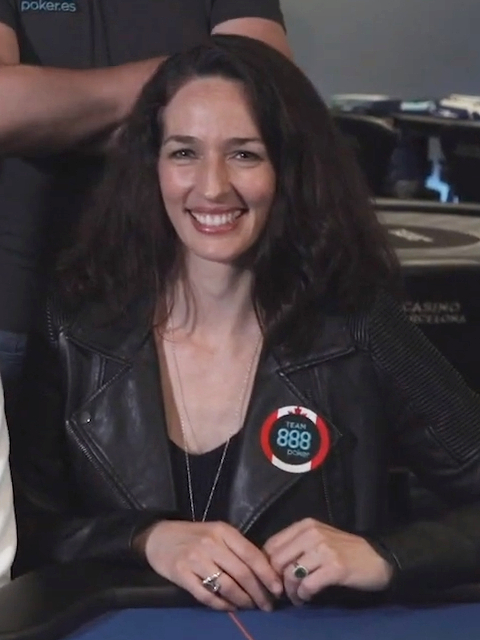
- Kara Scott in 2019
- Nicknames: Great Scott, Kara Scott Chad

World Series of Poker
- Bracelet: None
- Money finishes: 4
- Highest WSOP Main Event finish: 104th, 2008

European Poker Tour
- Title: None
- Final table: None
- Money finish: 1

Kara Scott /ˈkɛərə/ is a Canadian British TV personality, journalist and poker player.

Born in northern Alberta, Canada, Scott moved to the United Kingdom in 1999 and worked in the UK media until 2009 when she moved to California. Having trained in Muay Thai while she lived in Canada, she became a sports presenter and producer on Five. She is a brand ambassador for 888poker and host of 888poker News.

== Television hosting ==
She was the host of the first televised backgammon series with Paul Magriel and John Clark, High Stakes Backgammon, produced from the 2005 World Backgammon Championships for Game TV in Canada and Pokerzone in the UK. Scott also hosted the first series of World Series of Backgammon, in 2006 which aired across Europe on Eurosport, Poker Channel Europe and Game TV in Canada.

Scott was also one of the main hosts of the award winning show "Poker Night Live". She quickly immersed herself in the poker media and previously wrote a regular column in industry magazine "Flush" as well as having articles published in "Poker Player Magazine" and her poker exploits have been documented in other poker media such as "CardPlayer Magazine", "Gambling Online Magazine" and "UK PokerNews." Scott is also one half of the duo behind UK poker podcast "On The Rail".

Scott is known as one of the faces of Sky Poker on Sky Television channel 865 (alongside Helen Chamberlain, Richard Orford and Norman Pace); a dedicated poker channel which launched in February 2007, as well as being the TV Host for the 2007/2008 season of the European Poker Tour. In August 2008, following her success at the World Series of Poker, she announced her departure from Sky Poker.

Scott is also involved in the film world and was one of the stars (and the line producer) for martial arts film "Sucker Punch" starring Danny John-Jules.

In 2007, Scott lost a proposition bet to Chris Tessaro, host of The Hardcore Poker Radio Show, resulting in her having to do her commentary from the EPT San Remo while dressed in a bunny suit.

In February 2010, she joined Gabe Kaplan as co-host of GSN's High Stakes Poker for its sixth season, following the departure of previous host A. J. Benza. Scott's role is conducting direct interviews with the players as the game progresses.

Kara joined ESPN's coverage of the World Series of Poker 2011 Main Event as a "sideline" reporter.

Scott had been based in California. After marrying Giovanni Rizzo in 2013, Scott lived in Parma, Italy. Scott has lived in Slovenia for over a year.

== Poker ==
Scott has played in various television poker tournaments broadcast on Challenge and Five, primarily in celebrity heats. She won the celebrity heat of the PartyPoker.net World Woman's Open which aired on Five in late 2007, before going on to win the first main heat and placing 6th in the final. In 2008, she won the PartyPoker Sports Star Challenge. Scott finished second at the Irish Open in 2009, winning €312,600. As of 2010, her total live poker tournament winnings exceed $550,000.

At the 2008 World Series of Poker (WSOP) $10,000 buy-in Main Event, Scott finished in 104th place out of a field of 6,844 players, earning $41,816. Scott is the only woman who cashed in both the 2008 and 2009 WSOP Main Event, the second woman ever to have cashed in back-to-back Main Events, after finishing 238th out of a field of 6,494 players in 2009.

Responding to critics, Scott said, "I know a lot of people don't think I can play and there are always going to be people who say I can't. But I have made the final of a female championship, I won a Sports Star Challenge, I went deep in the World Series of Poker Main Event and now I've come second in the Irish Open."

On 14 January 2009 PartyPoker announced that Scott would join Team Party alongside other poker professionals such as Mike Sexton and Felipe "Mojave" Ramos, which means she will appear playing more often with the PartyPoker branding and yet still continue with her Poker TV presenting career.

In her new blog over at Cardrunners, Kara Scott announced, that she would be leaving PartyPoker as 2015 began. Scott explained that the reason for her departure was the lack of TV projects.

In 2016 Scott signed with 888poker as brand ambassador. In the past she held a similar role with Tilt Events with her husband Giovanni.
