= Veronica Brill =

Poker player and journalist

- Born: Poland
- Occupations: Television presenter; commentator; poker player; analytics developer
- Years active: 2021–present (television presenting)
- Known for: Exposing poker cheating scandal, sideline reporter on Poker After Dark
- Notable work: Poker After Dark

Veronica Brill is a Polish-born Canadian–American television presenter, commentator, recreational poker player and an analytics developer. She has worked as a sideline reporter on NBC's long-running series Poker After Dark since 2021.

In the late 2010s, Brill identified strong evidence of cheating that caused a major scandal at the Stones Gambling Hall in Sacramento where she occasionally played and worked as a color commentator on livestreamed broadcasts.
