= Dee Luong =

American poker player (born 1968)

- Nickname: None
- Born: March 29, 1968 (age 58); Los Angeles, California

World Series of Poker
- Bracelet: None
- Money finishes: 2
- Highest WSOP Main Event finish: None

World Poker Tour
- Title: None
- Final table: None
- Money finish: 1

Dee Luong (born March 29, 1968) is a professional poker player from Henderson, Nevada. She made a final table of the World Series of Poker in 2003 and was featured in 2007 on the NBC television program Poker After Dark.

== Biography ==
Luong was born in Vietnam and immigrated to the United States with her family at age 6, settling in San Gabriel, California. At age 21, she moved to Las Vegas, where professional poker player Huck Seed introduced her to high-stakes poker.

Luong has reached the final table in several major tournaments. In the 2003 L.A. Poker Classic limit Texas hold 'em event, she finished in third place, and six months later she finished third in the 2003 World Series of Poker limit hold 'em shootout for $30,000.

As of 2012, her total live tournament winnings exceed $90,000.
