= Justin Smith (poker player) =

American poker player (born 1988)

- Nickname: Boosted J
- Born: January 8, 1988 (age 38); Hartford, Connecticut, U.S.

World Series of Poker
- Bracelet: None
- Final tables: 3
- Money finishes: 22
- Highest WSOP Main Event finish: None

World Poker Tour
- Title: 1
- Final tables: 4
- Money finishes: 6

European Poker Tour
- Title: None
- Final table: None
- Money finish: 1

Justin "Boosted J" Smith (born January 8, 1988) is an American high-stakes poker player living in Los Angeles, CA.

Smith began playing poker at the age of 17, after needing a wheelchair for several weeks which had caused him to lose his part-time job. A friend gave him some lessons on Texas Hold'Em, and Smith began his online poker career with a bankroll of $50. Though his young age had prevented him from racking up a long list of tournament victories, Smith experienced substantial success in high-stakes short-handed ring games at levels up to $2,000/$4,000 and $4,000/$8,000

== Early years ==
Born in Hartford, Connecticut, Smith spent the first two years of his life in New York and Connecticut. He also lived for a brief time in Melbourne, Florida before moving to the Kissimmee/Poinciana area in central Florida. He worked as a bagger/clerk at a local grocery store while attending high school at Poinciana High. During his senior year, a near-fatal motorcycle accident left him in a wheelchair temporarily and led to his subsequent unemployment. A long-time friend introduced him to low stakes online poker during this period as a way to earn a few dollars here and there.

== Tournament poker ==
Smith's first major tournament success came during the 2007 Full Tilt Online Poker Series, where he tied for 1st in the $1.5 Million Guarantee, good for $175,326. As of year end 2011 he has amassed just over two million dollars in tournament winnings, including 5 cashes in the 2009 World Series of Poker (WSOP), and a 3rd place finish at the 2009 WPT Bellagio Cup V Championship for $464,870. Justin accomplished a remarkable feat by final tabling the 2010 WPT Bellagio Cup VI with a 2nd place finish for $594,755 after busting out Phil Ivey in 3rd place. He followed that up shortly after in 2010 with a WPT High Roller Title win in London for a £141,000 score. In 2011 he had a 4th place finish at the 2011 Doyle Brunson Five Diamond World Poker Classic $100,000 buy-in Super High Roller Event worth $289,440. At the 2012 World Series of Poker, he played in the much hyped $1 Million Buy-in "One Drop Foundation" Tournament featuring 48 of the top pros competing against some of the wealthiest men in the world. 1st place in the tournament would also receive over $18,000,000. Justin was unsuccessful as the first person knocked out of the tournament with a straight against a flush facing a French businessman. Smith appeared on the cover of Bluff Magazine's 2010 October issue as well as the cover of the January 2011 issue of WPT Magazine.

As of 2019, Smith has live tournament winnings exceeding $2,200,000.

== Cash games ==
Though Smith has experienced worldwide success in numerous tournaments, the majority of his time is spent playing cash games. Since starting with online $.01/$.02 Limit Texas Hold'Em in early 2005, he has advanced to a variety of games at the highest levels both live and online. These include games like Omaha, Lowball, Seven Card Stud, and Texas Hold'Em at levels up to $4,000/$8,000 limit as well as reports of playing as high as $2,000/$4,000/$8,000 blind Pot Limit Omaha during rumored high-stakes marathon games running at the Bellagio, Rio, and Aria casino hotels in Las Vegas, Nevada, during consecutive summers. He was also a red named pro on Full Tilt Poker and a frequent player at the "Big Game" in Bobby's Room, a cardroom named after Bobby Baldwin, at the Bellagio Casino in Las Vegas. Justin has also been seen on multiple high-stakes cash game TV shows, such as the Million Dollar Cash Game, filmed in London and Australia, as well as Poker After Dark on NBC.

== Other ventures ==
He was also known to be breaking into Hollywood film production by co-producing the 2012 Sony/Samuel Goldwyn theatrically released film "Detention" with stars Josh Hutcherson and Dane Cook, directed by Joseph Kahn. After this, he found himself producing "Radical" with Cynthia Mort featuring young, righteous seeking hackers.

In the early part of 2015, he again found himself collaborating with director Joseph Kahn and was credited as an Executive Producer on the controversial, yet critically acclaimed and popular POWER/RANGERS short movie produced by Adi Shankar.

In a follow-up to their collaboration on POWER/RANGERS, Smith and Shankar have at least two more film projects that have already been produced with superhero drama GODS and SECRETS and battle-rap comedy-drama BODIED, of which the latter is also helmed by Kahn.

Smith and Kahn have spent the last few years developing a poker-related narrative television show. The show is said to reflect Smith’s personal experiences as a professional gambler, but little has been revealed about the overall concept. In an interview with PokerListings, Smith confirmed the show will go into production ‘very soon’.

In addition to film production, Justin is an art collector and enthusiast. His involvement in the art world and connection to polarizing art dealer-collector Stefan Simchowitz has led to mentions in the New York Times Magazine, Le Monde, and Los Angeles Magazine.

He also serves on the board of the Project L.A.C.E. charity organization, a non-profit organization dedicated to helping end poverty, loneliness, and neglect of children and families everywhere by implementing programs, coming to the aid of other organizations helping the youth and worldwide medical missions.
