= Proposition bet =

Bet on an event not directly affecting a game's outcome

In gambling, a proposition bet (prop bet, spot bet, prop, novelty, or a side bet) is a bet made regarding the occurrence or non-occurrence during a game (usually a gambling game) of an event not directly affecting the game's outcome.

Proposition bets in sports are differentiated from the general bets for or against a particular team or regarding the total number of points scored. Traditionally, proposition bets can be made on outcomes such as the number of strikeouts a pitcher will accumulate in a baseball game, whether a non-offensive player will score in an American football game, which team will score the first points of the game, the discipline record of teams in a match, the timing of certain events, the number of specific events per team or in the entire match. Realistically any statistically discrete event contained in a match or game could be bet on.

Fixing part of a match for a certain result in a proposition bet is called spot-fixing.

== Examples ==
There are a wide range of events or outcomes commonly bet on, including:

- The number of balls/strikes thrown by a baseball pitcher
- Which team scores first in a match
- The specific face value of one or more individual dice in craps
- Which cards will make up the flop in a hand of poker
- Which cards are dealt in blackjack
- Specific aspects of the pageantry surrounding a sporting event
- The color of a Gatorade shower at the Super Bowl

Also bets can include outcomes such as the length of the national anthem performance or even wardrobe choices of halftime performers during the Super Bowl. Some jurisdictions do not allow casinos to offer any type of non-sport related proposition bets, but these kinds of prop bets can often be found online.

== Dare for money ==
Less commonly, "proposition bet" (in this context also "one-of-a-kind bet") denotes a dare for money. The bet is on whether the "dared" person will make a given event happen. If the "dared" person accepts the bet, they will collect if they succeed or pay if they fail.

For an example detailed in the book The Professor, the Banker, and the Suicide King, David Grey once bet Howard Lederer, a professional poker player who became vegetarian following gastric bypass surgery, $10,000 for Lederer to eat an offered cheeseburger. Lederer accepted the wager, ate the cheeseburger, and won the bet.

== Spot fixing ==
Spot-fixing is an illegal activity where a person involved in the game takes steps to ensure a certain result for a proposition bet. Instead of fixing an entire match, or shaving points, spot fixing can be done with as little as one player, and can involve ensuring a certain outcome on only a single play, and may be completely unrelated to the points/results in a game.

Examples include footballer Matt Le Tissier attempting to fix the time of a throw-in by kicking it out immediately after the game started, or Ryan Tandy attempting to fix the first point scored method in a rugby league game, failing after the opposition decided against kicking a penalty goal and instead scored a try. Multiple cricket players on teams at all levels of the sport have also attempted to fix events, such as the number of wides or no-balls in an over or the number of runs scored.

The fact that these minor events often contribute a minor or non-existent impact on the score or result of a game makes recruiting players for spot fixing an easier attraction than attempting to fix an entire match that may consist of dozens of players.

== Props on college athletes ==
While sports betting wagers often involve player prop bets, sportsbooks have taken a step back in their offerings. Due to past scandals, NCAA president Charlie Baker called for a ban on prop bets in college sports in early 2024. Some states followed suit and adjusted their laws while other states did not change any regulations. Stating "[we have an] obligation to protect the safety and the integrity of college athletes and college athletics as a whole", the chairman of the Louisiana Gaming Control Board, Ronnie Johns, was quick to abide by the request. The proposition bet ban on college athletes ranges from state to state in many ways: no bets on players from local universities, no college prop bets at all, no futures wagers on awards, etc.

== See also ==
- Sports betting
- Point shaving
