= Stones Gambling Hall cheating scandal =

Unorthodox poker playing that minimized losses

Postlegate
- Date: September 2019
- Venue: Stones Gambling Hall
- Location: Citrus Heights, California, near Sacramento, California; 38.6923°N 121.2880°W
- Type: Poker cheating scandal
- Cause: Alleged misuse of RFID and electronic devices
- Motive: Gain unfair advantage in poker games
- Target: Opposing poker players
- Perpetrator: Mike Postle (alleged)
- First reporter: Veronica Brill
- Organised by: Justin Kuraitis (Poker and Livestream Director) and Stones Gambling Hall management
- Filmed by: Stones Live
- Participants: Mike Postle, Veronica Brill, Justin Kuraitis, and multiple poker players
- Outcome: Defamation lawsuits dropped; Postle’s winning streak ended
- Accused: Mike Postle (civil case)
- Convicted: None
- Litigation: $30M class-action lawsuit dismissed; Anti-SLAPP rulings in favor of Veronica Brill and Todd Witteles; Postle’s defamation lawsuit dropped

In late September 2019, Stones Gambling Hall, located in Citrus Heights, near Sacramento, California, came to prominence due to a cheating scandal that became known as Postlegate. Mike Postle was publicly accused of cheating in poker games he participated in during livestream events hosted at Stones Gambling Hall. "Stones Live" livestream poker games utilized playing cards with embedded RFID sensors that scanned the playing cards and transmitted identifying information (the cards' suits and ranks) into the livestream's technical control room and to play-by-play announcers and color commentators; casino management and livestream supervisors also had access to real-time identifying information of otherwise unknown, facedown, cards.

Veronica Brill (a poker color commentator, interviewer, recreational player, and medical analyst) made the first public accusation of Postle's alleged cheating. Brill's allegations were reported by Scott Van Pelt on ESPN's SportsCenter during its October 3, 2019, broadcast. Initially, industry, local, and national media closely followed the evolving story, but interest waned after criminal charges were not brought by law enforcement, and as civil lawsuits were adjudicated, settled, or dismissed (see litigation).

== Allegations ==
In July 2018, Postle went on a prolonged winning streak, making around $250,000 in low-stakes ($1–3 and $2–5) no-limit Texas hold 'em games held at Stones Gambling Hall. His streak occurred while playing live-streamed games. In September 2019, commentator Veronica Brill witnessed many perplexing and unorthodox poker plays by Postle that seemed to maximize the expected value of his hand, which increased her long-held suspicion that he was cheating.

In one hand, Postle folded a strong hand (that happened to lose to a stronger hand held by someone else) instead of calling, which prompted Brill to state: "It doesn't make sense. It's like he knows. It doesn't make sense. It's weird."

Brill posted an 18-minute video a week later detailing Postle's most suspicious hands, alleging that Postle played in a way that was too accurate even for game theory optimal play. Brill also tweeted out her suspicions.

Many people from poker's professional community (players, announcers, bloggers, authors, card room and technical control management) who viewed and commented on archived video footage from Stones Live livestreams echoed Brill's concern that Postle must have had access to real-time information about his opponents' hole cards and hand strength. Numerous people from poker's game theory optimal (GTO) community stated that the hands Postle profited from occurred at rates so mathematically improbable they could only have been attained by cheating.

From July 2018 to September 2019, Postle (when he was allegedly cheating) consistently picked the perfect spots to bluff, call, bet, raise, and fold. In addition, archived video shows that he repeatedly stared down into his lap, where he kept his cell phone. This led to the suspicion that he was receiving information about the other players' hands on his cell phone.

During the times he was not looking at his lap while allegedly cheating, it has been theorized that he was receiving electronic signals in the brim of his hat. Prior to July 2018 and his suspicious winning streak, Postle usually kept his cell phone on Stones Gambling Hall's poker table's railing, in plain view of his opponents (where other players kept their cell phones). During that timeframe, Postle's poker results were average, and he was not considered to be playing exceptionally well.

== Litigation ==
On October 9, 2019, 24 poker players filed a $30 million class-action lawsuit against Postle, Stones Gambling Hall and its poker and livestream manager Justin "JRK" Kuraitis. In June 2020, Federal Judge William B. Shubb dismissed the lawsuit against all three defendants, citing a very old California law. The case against Postle was dismissed "with prejudice", precluding a case from being refiled against him.

Three months after the dismissal, 60 of the then 88 plaintiffs accepted a settlement with King's Casino LLC, which owns Stones Gambling Hall, and Kuraitis. Brill was among the remaining 28 plaintiffs who did not settle. Less than a month afterward, Postle filed a $330 million defamation lawsuit against a dozen individuals, including poker celebrity Daniel Negreanu, three-time World Series of Poker winner Phil Galfond, and ESPN. Postle's attorneys later filed to remove themselves from that case.

On December 8, 2020, defendant Todd Witteles filed an anti-SLAPP motion to dismiss Postle's lawsuit declaring it "frivolous and a violation of Witteles' free-speech rights."

On May 13, 2021, the judge ruled against Postle and ordered him to pay $27,000 for Witteles' legal fees and court costs.

On January 13, 2021, Brill filed her own "anti-SLAPP" motion. On June 16, 2021, Judge Shama H. Mesiwala ruled in favor of Brill and awarded her $27,000. Postle did not appear at the anti-SLAPP hearings; therefore, the order went into effect immediately.

On April 1, 2021, Postle filed a request with Sacramento County Superior Court to drop his defamation lawsuit.

In September 2021, Postle filed a motion to avoid involuntary bankruptcy.

On January 7, 2022, a confidential agreement was entered into Postle's bankruptcy records which closed the only remaining litigation stemming from Stone Gamblings Hall livestream poker cheating scandal. That turn of events effectively put an end to the official Postlegate saga.
