= Alan Boston =

American poker player

Alan "Boston" Dvorkis is a professional sports bettor and poker player. He was a red pro at Full Tilt Poker. Boston is a specialist at Seven-card stud.

Boston had his first World Series of Poker cash in 1993 and finished 3rd in a $2,500 Seven-card stud event. Over the years he had many cashes, mostly in seven card stud. Boston's best finish was 2nd in the 1994, $2,500 7 stud event. Not known for no limit, he did play on Poker After Dark in 2007.

Boston is best known however as a college basketball handicapper. He was featured in the 2001 book The Odds:One Season, Three Gamblers and The Death of Their Las Vegas. He was also featured in the 2016 documentary, The Best Of It. Boston has appeared on radio in Las Vegas and on gambling/poker podcasts.
