= Olivier Busquet =

American poker player (born 1981)

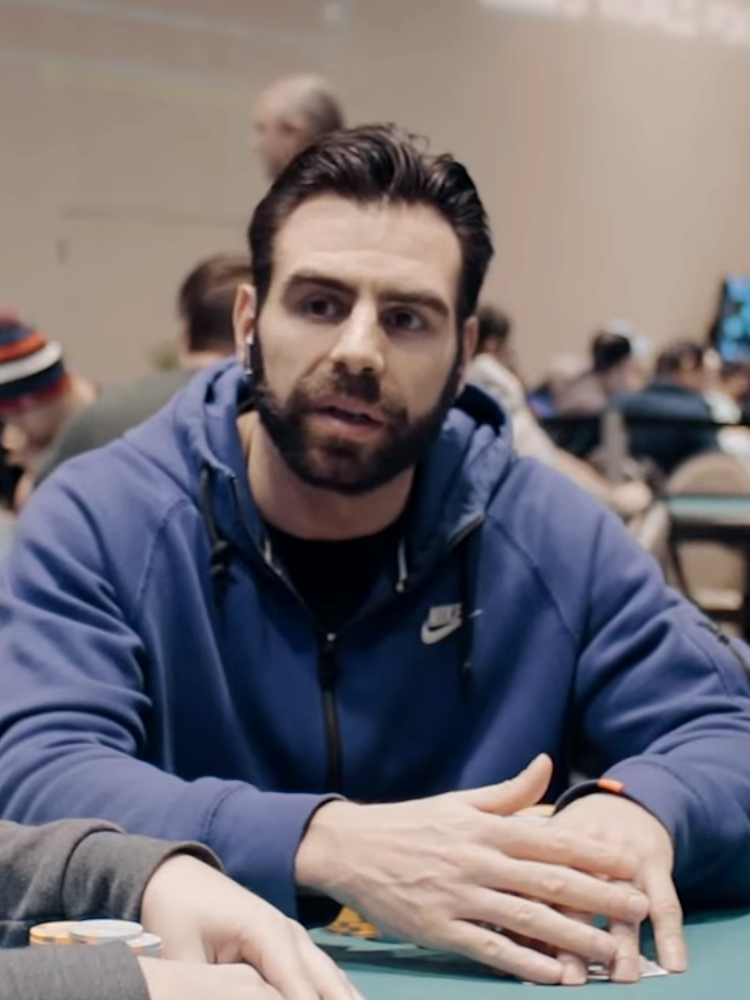
- Olivier Busquet in 2019
- Born: August 22, 1981 (age 45); New York City, United States

World Series of Poker
- Bracelet: None
- Final table: 1
- Money finishes: 21
- Highest WSOP Main Event finish: 244, 2008

World Poker Tour
- Title: 1
- Final tables: 3
- Money finishes: 15

European Poker Tour
- Titles: 2
- Final tables: 9
- Money finishes: 17

Olivier Busquet (born August 22, 1981) is an American professional poker player.

== Early life ==
Busquet was born on August 22, 1981, in New York City. He attended The Allen-Stevenson School, and Trinity High School, where he competed in chess and played violin in the orchestra. Busquet then attended Cornell University and graduated with a degree in philosophy. Afterwards, he worked on Wall Street for some time.

== Poker career ==
Busquet, who competes in both online and live tournaments, is known as an aggressive player. At the beginning of his career, he lost his bankroll a few times. He found success in heads up sit and go games and earned $2 million in sit and go games before any other player had even earned $1 million. In the 2008 and 2009 World Series of Poker main events, he finished in 244th place and 311th place, respectively. In the fall of 2009, Busquet won the Borgata WPT Poker Open, defeating the largest field in WPT history. In July 2025, Busquet returned to live poker and won the Borgata Summer Poker Open Championship, earning US $255,135 for first place.

Busquet appeared on the last season of Poker After Dark in 2011.

As of 2021, Busquet has earned over $9,000,000 in 126 live tournaments in his career of which $765,879 have come from cashes at the WSOP.

World Series of Poker results
| Year | Cashes | Final Tables | Bracelets |
|---|---|---|---|
| 2007 | 2 | 0 | 0 |
| 2008 | 3 | 0 | 0 |
| 2009 | 2 | 0 | 0 |
| 2011 | 3 | 0 | 0 |
| 2012 | 1 | 0 | 0 |
| 2013 | 4 | 1 | 0 |
| 2014 | 6 | 0 | 0 |

== Online Poker ==
Busquet started off as an online player, originally playing low stakes NLHE cash.

His breakthrough came in 2006, when he found the format best suited for him – heads-up Sit&Go's. He made an estimated $2.75 million profit over the course of tens of thousands of S&G's

He plays under the screen name “livb112” on Full Tilt and “adonis112” on PokerStars. Across those two accounts, he has also amassed $840,000 in MTT winnings, in addition to his S&G winnings.

== MMA ==
At the end of 2015, Busquet challenged the poker community to have an MMA (mixed martial arts) match as a prop bet with $150,000 on the line.

JC Alvarado took on the challenge, fighting at 165 pounds, while Busquets fought at 187.5 pounds. The match took place on April 21, 2016, at the Syndicate MMA facility in Las Vegas. Bousquet ended up winning with a technical knock-out in the 3rd round.
