= Garrett Adelstein =

American poker player (born 1986)

- Nickname: Gman
- Born: May 16, 1986 (age 40); Tucson, Arizona

World Series of Poker
- Bracelet: None
- Money finishes: 3
- Highest WSOP Main Event finish: 143rd, 2016

Garrett Adelstein (born May 16, 1986) is an American professional poker player from Tucson, Arizona who focuses on live no-limit hold 'em cash games. He appeared on Survivor: Cagayan where he was the second player voted off.

== Poker career ==
Adelstein focuses on live cash games. He was a coach at Phil Galfond's poker academy Run It Once until 2014. He is considered an aggressive player and often makes large bets.

Some of his biggest winnings from professional tournaments include a $48,000 win from the PokerStars Caribbean Adventure in 2008, $48,487 from the 2010 WSOP Main Event and $49,108 from the 2016 WSOP Main Event.

In 2017, he began appearing regularly on live poker shows including Live at the Bike hosted in The Bicycle Hotel & Casino in California and has appeared on the reboot of Poker After Dark. One of his most notable hands was against professional poker player Matt Berkey in the November broadcast of Poker After Dark for $459,000. His A♠ A♣ beat Berkey's K♠ K♥. The board came 7♥ K♦ 5♠ A♥ 6♣ giving both players three of a kind, and they went all-in on the river. Adelstein made a second appearance in the Poker After Dark episode Dead Money.

=== Adelstein-Lew controversy ===
On September 29, 2022, Adelstein lost a hand while playing at Hustler Casino, during the "Hustler Casino Live" stream. His opponent, amateur Robbi Jade Lew, holding J♣ 4♥ versus Adelstein's 8♣ 7♣, called off her stack of $108,300 on the turn of 10♥ 10♣ 9♣ 3♥.

The river was run twice, coming first 9♦ and then A♠, neither of which were outs for Adelstein. After Lew tabled her hand at showdown, Adelstein was visibly disturbed, believing Lew had cheated. He departed the table several hands later, and shortly thereafter, a member of management escorted Lew away from the table. Although Lew refunded Adelstein his bets in the hand, he quit the game. Adelstein tweeted that he had been cheated and later suggested that Lew may have been part of a cheating ring involving at least three people. Lew maintained her innocence, sharing the results of a polygraph test she took shortly after on October 12, 2022.

== Survivor ==
In 2013, Adelstein appeared on Survivor: Cagayan as a member of the "Brains" tribe where he was the second player voted off. Adelstein managed to find a Hidden Immunity Idol, but elected not to bring it to Tribal Council.
