= Melanie Weisner =

American poker player (born 1986)

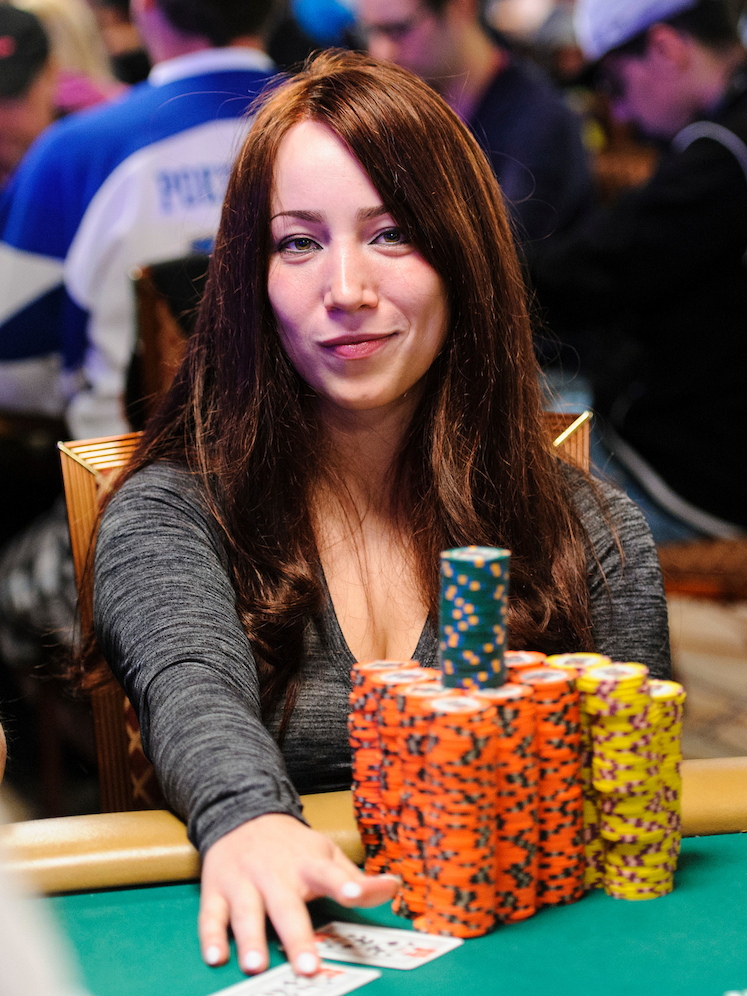
- Melanie Weisner
- Nickname: Callisto 5
- Born: September 30, 1986 (age 40)

World Series of Poker
- Bracelet: None
- Final table: None
- Money finishes: 25
- Highest WSOP Main Event finish: 127th, 2016

World Poker Tour
- Title: 1
- Final table: None
- Money finish: 1

European Poker Tour
- Title: None
- Final table: None
- Money finishes: 6

Melanie Weisner (born September 30, 1986) is an American professional poker player. She is also known by her PokerStars online screen name Callisto 5.

== Poker ==
=== Online poker ===
Born in Houston, Texas, Weisner studied vocal performance at New York University before pursuing poker full-time. She was introduced to poker when her brother had success playing online. Weisner earned over $400,000 of online tournament winnings playing part-time during her study at NYU.

Weisner has had several notable online tournament wins. On March 30, 2009, she took third out of 10,614 entrants for $40,000 in the Pokerstars Turbo Takedown, a tournament with an entry fee of frequent player points with a prize pool of $1,000,000. On May 16, 2010, Weisner finished second out of 8,896 entrants in Full Tilt Poker's Double Deuce 200k Guaranteed Tournament, for $24,000. On August 2, 2010, she took third in the Pokerstars Sunday $500 "500k Guaranteed" Tournament for $50,398. On November 18, 2012, Weisner took fifth place in the same tournament for $20,034. On December 30, 2012, she took fourth in the Pokerstars Sunday $100+ Rebuys tournament for $21.893. On April 7, 2013, Weisner took third in the Pokerstars $215 Sunday Second Chance tournament for $26,933.

In addition to multi-table tournaments, Weisner is also a heads-up sit-and-go tournament specialist. She hosted the heads-up event in Full Tilt Poker's FTOPS XVII.

Weisner is a contributor to the online poker radio show Cold Call hosted by Bryan Micon, Brandon Gerson and Adam Schoenfeld.

=== European Poker Tour ===
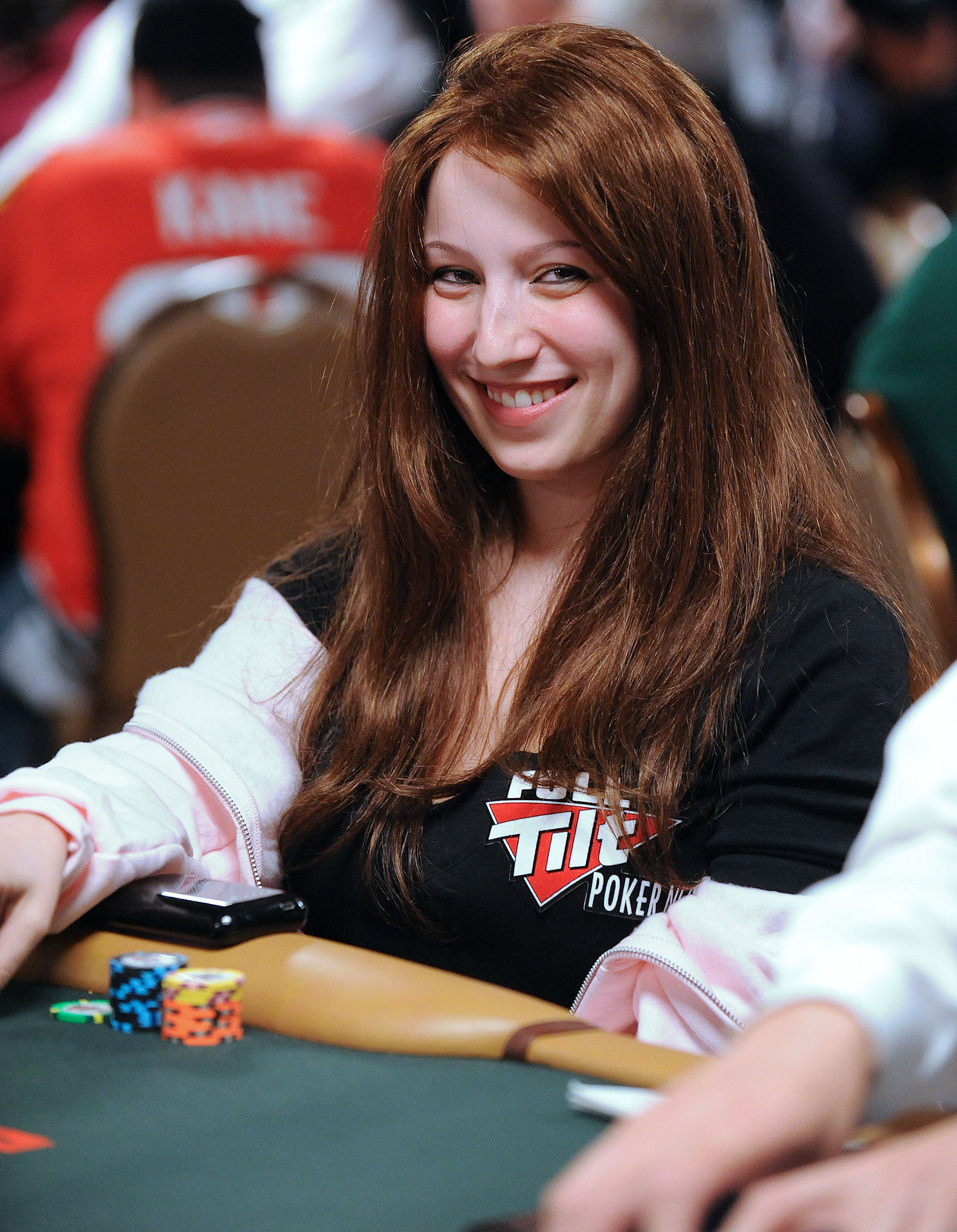
Melanie Weisner

Six months after graduating in May 2009, Weisner began to travel the live circuit. In December 2009, she qualified online for the European Poker Tour in Prague and won the Ladies Championship event there for €3100 ($4,646). Weisner subsequently final tabled the same events at both EPT Deauville and EPT San Remo, entering with the chip lead at both of the final tables in both events and taking fourth and sixth respectively. She then won the €1,000 Ladies Championship at the European Poker Tour Grand Final in Monte Carlo for €25,000 ($33,282), after being atop the leaderboard of the Main Event for three days and finishing in 71st for €25,000. Weisner is the only player to ever win two EPT Ladies Championship events. In August 2010, she finished second in the Partouche Poker Tour's Heads Up event for $32,994. In December 2010, Weisner took 12th in the EPT Prague main event for €30,000 ($43,035). In May 2011, she chipleaded the EPT Grand Final in Madrid before finishing in 42nd for €25,000.

In season 8 (2011-2012), Weisner cashed three EPT main events consecutively. She finished 91st for €8,500 ($11,719) in EPT Sanremo, 28th for DKK 65,000 ($11,491) in EPT Copenhagen, and 28th for €11,000 ($14,430) in EPT Madrid. In the EPT Grand Final in Monaco, Weisner finished second in the Heads Up Championship for €39,250 ($51,820). She was defeated by Victoria Coren in the first ever all-female heads up final on the European Poker Tour. This finish, coupled with her other cashes during the season other heads-up events, put Weisner in first place in the Player of the Year race in the heads-up division. She won Player of the Year for Season 8.

=== World Series of Poker ===
At the 2010 World Series of Poker, Weisner finished tied for 18th for $18,420 in the $10,000 No-Limit Heads-Up Championship event, losing to Vanessa Rousso in the fourth round. She finished 56th for $11,607 in a $2500 no-limit event with a field of 1,942 players.

At the 2011 World Series of Poker, Weisner finished 14th in a $1500 No-Limit event for $24,679, one of her five cashes at the WSOP. This made her the woman with the highest number of cashes at the 2011 series. Weisner ranked tied for 15th overall in the 2011 WSOP Number of Cashes rankings.

At the 2011 World Series of Poker Europe, Weisner finished 33rd for €27,500 ($39,500) in the Main Event after chipleading the event on day 3.

At the 2012 World Series of Poker, Weisner cashed three times. She finished 57th in the $1500 Ante-Only event for $4,044. Weisner also won her first shootout tables in both the $1500 and $3000 shootouts, cashing for $5,295 and $9,086 respectively, being the only person to do so at the 2012 WSOP.

At the 2013 World Series of Poker, Weisner cashed four times. She finished tied for 16th in the $10,000 No-Limit Heads-Up Championship event for $26,237. Weisner also finished 301st in the $10,000 No-Limit Hold-Em Championship Main Event, cashing for $32,242.

At the 2014 World Series of Poker, Weisner cashed twice. She finished 21st in the $5,000 No-Limit Hold-em event for $22,309 after chipleading the tournament. Weisner also finished 26th in the $1,000 Ladies Event for $4,613.

At the 2016 World Series of Poker, Weisner cashed five times, marking 25 total cashes in the WSOP to date. Most notably, she finished 127th in the $10,000 No-Limit Hold-Em Championship Main Event, cashing for $49,108 and was the second-to-last woman standing in the event. Weisner chip led the event during days 3 and 4, marking the first time a woman has been chip leader of the WSOP Main Event.

At the 2021 World Series of Poker, Weisner cashed seven times, with her best finish being 17th in the $1500 six-handed event for $17,141.

At the 2022 World Series of Poker, Weisner cashed six times, marking 49 total cashes in the WSOP to date.

=== World Poker Tour ===
At the 2012 World Poker Tour in Johannesburg, South Africa, Weisner claimed her first major title, taking down the $1,000 no-limit six-max event for $41,289, defeating former EPT champion Lucien Cohen heads-up.

=== Rankings ===
As of 2022, Weisner is ranked 49th on the Women's All Time tournament money list. Her total live tournament winnings exceed $962,000.

=== Television ===
Weisner was featured on "Idol Week" of NBC's Poker After Dark in 2011. The episode was a $50,000 buy-in, winner-take-all tournament and featured Tom Dwan, Doyle Brunson, Annette Obrestad, Eric Baldwin, and Andrew Lichtenberger. She took third place, losing to the eventual winner, Dwan.

Weisner is featured on Late Night Poker's 2011 season, taking third place in the $10,000 shoot-out tournament.

Weisner is featured on Season V in the playoffs for the Party Poker Premier League, a $10,000 shoot-out tournament where the winner receives a $100,000 entry to the Premier League format tournament. She finished second in the tournament, losing to Ben Wilinofsky heads-up.

Weisner is featured on "Femme Fatale" of Poker After Dark in 2018. The episode was a $100/$200 cash game with a $20,000 minimum buy-in and featured Kathy Liebert, Kristen Bicknell, Xuan Liu, JJ Liu, Kitty Kuo, and Sofia Lovgren. She won over $100,000 in the game.
