= Shawn Sheikhan =

Iranian poker player (born 1969)

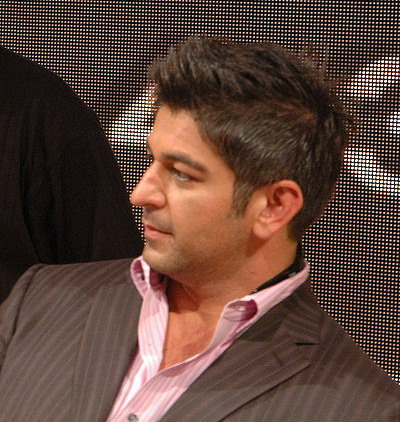
- Sheikhan at the 2006 NBC National Heads-Up Poker Championship.
- Nicknames: Sheiky; The Iron Sheik
- Born: Shahram Sheikhan; December 29, 1969 (age 56); Iran

World Series of Poker
- Money finishes: 10
- Highest WSOP Main Event finish: 11th, 2005

Shahram "Shawn" Sheikhan (born 29 December 1969) is a professional poker player who currently lives in Las Vegas, Nevada with his wife and daughter. Sheikhan is the owner of a retail chain of tobacco and tattoo stores.

== Poker career ==
Sheikhan is known for having terrible table etiquette. At the 2005 World Series of Poker (WSOP) he got into a much-publicized war of words with Mike Matusow after Sheikhan slammed the table when seeing a flop on a hand he was not involved in. Both players got a penalty since Matusow used a vulgarity after Sheikhan made the inappropriate reaction that gave away what his hand was, thus giving other players who were still in the hand free information that may have altered the outcome of the hand. He eventually was eliminiated in 11th place, earning $600,000. Sheikhan was involved in several more incidents, one involving Phil Hellmuth on the first week of the Poker After Dark broadcast when Hellmuth accused Shawn of refusing to stop talking while he was playing in a hand with Annie Duke, though in fact the entire table were conversing. Sheikhan busted Hellmuth shortly after this confrontation. In March 2006, Sheikhan made the final four of NBC's National Heads-Up Poker Championship (during the early rounds of which he told Gus Hansen, whom he eliminated, to throw away his cards - Sheikhan had made Four of a kind), earning $125,000. He lost to eventual winner Ted Forrest.

In July 2007 Sheikhan placed 3rd in the World Series of Poker No Limit Deuce to Seven Lowball event. He also won a Poker After Dark title defeating a field which consisted of Phil Laak, Phil Hellmuth, Daniel Negreanu, Mike Matusow and Antonio Esfandiari. This first place finish earned him $120,000. He has appeared in the GSN television series High Stakes Poker.

As of 2023, his total live tournament winnings exceed $1,500,000. His 10 cashes at the WSOP account for $1,160,910 of those winnings.

== Troubles ==
While driving in heavy rain during the 1999 Las Vegas flood, Sheikhan lost control of his vehicle and collided with another car, resulting in the death of one of its 91-year-old passengers.

Sheikhan, a resident alien since he was nine years old, was arrested at his Las Vegas home on 30 August 2007 for violating his immigration status due to a 1995 conviction for misdemeanor sexual battery on a child under 18, for which he served nine months in prison and five years' probation. According to Sheikhan's lawyer, David Chesnoff, the young woman in this case was a 17-year-old girl whom Sheikhan knew when he was in his early twenties. The U.S. Immigration and Customs Enforcement (ICE) actively searches for foreign nationals who were convicted of a sexual crime against children and then tries to get them deported. He was detained on an immigration hold for one week facing deportation proceedings, but those proceedings have been halted.

In June 2022, Sheikhan pled guilty to operating illegal marijuana dispensaries in Southern California; in November 2023, he was sentenced to four years in federal prison.
