= Alan Meltzer =

American businessman and poker player (1944–2011)

- Born: 1944; United States
- Died: October 31, 2011 (aged 67)
- Occupation: Businessman
- Known for: Wind-up Records

Alan Meltzer (1944 – October 31, 2011) was an American businessman and poker player who founded Wind-up Records along with his ex-wife Diana Meltzer.

== Record company ==
Meltzer owned Titus Oaks Records, four record stores in New York and Connecticut, that expanded into CD One Stop, one of the largest wholesale distributors of CDs in the 1980s and 1990s.

In 1997, he purchased Grass Records with his wife Diana Meltzer and started Wind-up Records. This record label was credited with the success of Creed, Seether, Finger Eleven, and Evanescence.

== Poker ==
Meltzer was a poker enthusiast who made multiple appearances on televised poker shows including on GSN's High Stakes Poker and Full Tilt Poker's Poker After Dark.

== Death ==
Meltzer died on October 31, 2011, at the age of 67. He left a $1.5 million inheritance to his doorman and driver.
