= CD One Stop =

American music distributor

CD One Stop was a distributor of pre-recorded music in the late 1980s through the 90s. It was started in 1985 by Alan Meltzer, owner of the Titus Oaks Records music chain in Long Island. Meltzer moved to Connecticut and launched the company, which was the first of its kind to distribute only compact discs, out of his house in Ridgefield.

Meltzer later rented an office and warehouse in neighboring Bethel. But the company's growth was enormous. By 1989, its 28,000 square feet (2,600 m^{2}) of office space and warehouse were barely enough. It moved to a 90,000-square-foot (8,400 m^{2}) facility in Bethel's Francis J. Clarke Industrial park. By 1992, the company had knocked down the northeast wall and doubled the warehouse to 180,000 square feet (17,000 m^{2}). By this time, it was also distributing cassettes and had taken over some exclusive distribution lines owned by Schwartz Bros. CD One Stop also opened a West Coast office at this time outside of Sacramento, California to compete with Valley Distributors.

In 1993, the company was sold to Alliance Entertainment Corp., a holding company buying up distributors such as Encore (Denver), Bassin (Miami), and Abbey Road (Los Angeles). Meltzer, and his key management staff, became the odd men out. But Meltzer was rumored to have invested heavily in a startup called CD Now, an early online music store, which later sold to Amazon becoming its music arm.

Meltzer's first attempt at a record label was in 1996 with Grass Records, which morphed into Wind Up Entertainment, which gave us the likes of Creed, Evanescence, and Seether. Steven Lerner, Marketing Director at CD One Stop, became the president of Wind Up.
