= ME vs. U =

Online poker reality show

ME vs. U is a web reality show produced by Ultimate Poker starring Danielle Andersen and Dan O'Brien. In ME vs. U these two Ultimate Poker pros face off in head to head competition. The winner receives a prize and the loser receives a punishment.
