= Matt Berkey =

American poker player (born 1982)

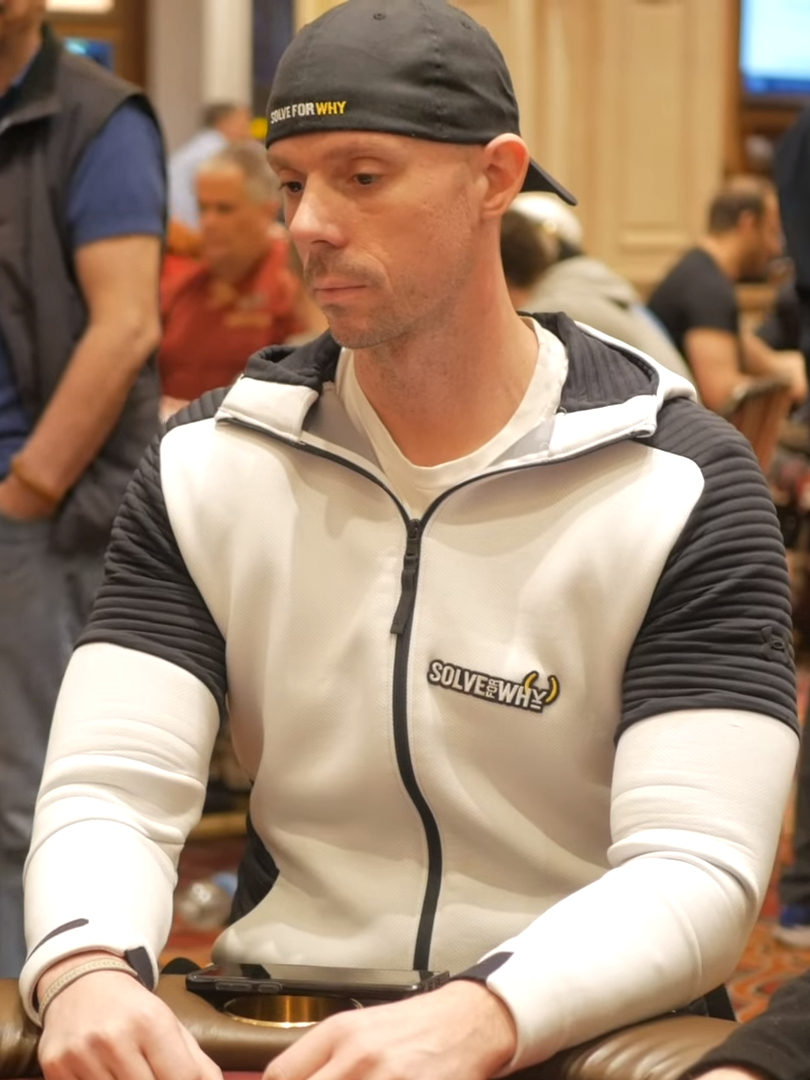
- Matt Berkey at WPT at Venetian 2019
- Nickname: berkey11
- Born: January 29, 1982 (age 44)

World Series of Poker
- Bracelet: None
- Money finishes: 30
- Highest WSOP Main Event finish: 43rd, 2010

World Poker Tour
- Title: None
- Money finishes: 8

European Poker Tour
- Title: None
- Money finish: 1

Matthew Berkey (born January 29, 1982) is an American professional poker player from Leechburg, Pennsylvania who focuses on live no limit hold 'em cash games.

== Early life ==
Berkey grew up in Leechburg, Pennsylvania with two siblings and aspired to be a baseball player. His parents struggled financially and were separated. His family received help from his grandparents. By the age of 13 Berkey moved in with his grandparents who pushed him in the right direction. In his youth, Berkey earned the nickname Eeyore, the donkey from Winnie the Pooh.

Originally, Matt Berkey wanted to become a professional baseball player. He even had a chance to take baseball scholarships from colleges, but he turned those opportunities down because of the distance from his hometown.

Berkey attended Gannon University, where he earned a bachelor's degree in Computer Science with a minor in Mathematics. While he started playing poker in high school, playing against friends for quarters, it was college where he decided to take the game more seriously. His newfound passion was a product of the Moneymaker Boom.

He went to his closest Indian Casino where he started to grind live cash games, and after graduating from college, Berkey chose his poker career over baseball.

== Poker career ==
Berkey plays online under the nickname berkey11. Berkey finished 43rd in the 2010 World Series of Poker main event.

In 2013, Berkey finished 3rd in the $3,000 No-Limit Hold'em Six Handed event for $199,733. Berkey won the 2015 $25,000 No Limit Hold'em High Roller event at the Aria Casino in December 2015 earning $315,180.

In May 2016, Berkey finished 5th in the $300,000 Super High Roller Bowl earning $1,100,000.

In 2017, Berkey was regularly seen playing live televised cash games. He finished 5th in 2017 World Series of Poker $1,500 Six-Max No-Limit Hold'em earning $87,141. Berkey started his own poker academy called Solve For Why. The academy intends on hosting a charity event in March 2018. Berkey appeared on Poker After Dark in November 2017 where he lost a $459,000 pot to poker player Garrett Adelstein while holding K♠ K♥ against Adelstein's A♠ A♣. The board came 7♥ K♦ 5♠ A♥ 6♣ giving both players a set. Both players went all in on the river.

As of 2022, Berkey's total live tournament earnings exceed $4,300,000.

In 2023, Matt Berkey beat high-stakes regular NikAirball for $1,029,700 in a heads-up grudge match. The match was held at Resorts World Las Vegas.

== Poker Projects ==
Matt Berkey is the founder of "Solve For Why", a Poker Academy. In 2021, with Tom Wheton, he announced the creation of "Above The Felt entertainment", a marketing agency for poker, in collaboration with Daren Elias, Chris Moneymaker, & Jamie Kerstetter.
