= 888poker =

Online poker cardroom

- Industry: Gambling
- Founded: 2002
- Headquarters: Gibraltar
- Area served: Worldwide
- Products: Online poker
- Parent: Evoke plc
- Website: 888poker.com

888poker, formerly Pacific Poker, is an international online poker brand owned by Evoke plc. It was founded in 2002, and is headquartered in Gibraltar.

== History ==
The poker provider was originally launched in 2002 as Pacific Poker and later rebranded 888poker. The site enjoyed early success due in part to a large number of players who joined from its more established sister site.

=== United States ===
When the United States Congress passed the Unlawful Internet Gambling Enforcement Act (UIGEA) in 2006, affirming that online gambling in the United States was illegal, 888poker was forced to close its doors to all American players. Changes to online gaming regulations in 2013 in some states have prompted a return by 888 to the US market.

==== Nevada ====
888poker has partnerships with several private gaming entities in Nevada, and New Jersey. Authorities in these states require that online casino providers join an offline partner in order to receive an operating license. On 21 March 2012, The Nevada Gaming Commission granted 888 a license as an Interactive Gaming Service Provider. 888 launched its online activity in Nevada officially on 15 September 2013.

==== New Jersey ====
On 26 November 2013, 888 successfully launched its online poker site for online poker players in New Jersey. 888 operates under a permit (permit number NJIGP 13-006 ) issued to its partner Caesars Interactive Entertainment (which is a subsidiary of Caesars Entertainment Corporation) to offer online gaming in New Jersey. Its poker offerings are available only in the state of New Jersey and to players who are at least 21 years old.

==== Delaware ====
On 2 May 2013, 888 announced that it had been selected by the Delaware Lottery as its Primary Vendor to operate internet gaming systems and services. 888 has signed a partnership agreement with Scientific Games, the largest technology provider for electronic lottery gaming in the United States as part of its operating license in the State of Delaware. The service is scheduled to become available to Delaware residents before the end of 2013.

=== Europe ===
==== Denmark ====
In Denmark, 888poker was launched as a localized version in September 2015, after acquiring a license from the Gambling Authority. After launch, 888 Denmark manager in Denmark, Simon Ravn, said: "We have a slightly different approach to the Danish poker market than many of the other poker providers; we want to offer value to all our players, rather than focus on sign up bonuses and new customers", adding that "people still want to play poker and we think we can offer a new, fresh experience with us".

==== Spain ====
On 15 June 2012, the General Directorate for the Regulation of Gambling (DGOJ), published on its website the definitive list of operators licensed to operate in Spain, including 888 Spain plc. 888poker offers its online products, combined with a series of live tournaments among which the SuperStack, with events in several Spanish cities in February which distributed more than €400,000 in prize money during 2014.

== Poker games offered and player experience ==
The 888poker offering includes poker game variations such as Texas Hold’em, Omaha (High & Low) and 7 Card Stud Poker, along with Sit & Go and Tournament games. Products are available on all major platforms, including PC, Android, and Apple devices. A new version of the mobile app was launched on Aug 21, 2013, providing mobile access to multi-table tournaments.

888poker was the first online poker provider to introduce poker tables with webcam integration to allow its members to socialize more with other players and to make the overall gaming experience more human.

=== Mobile poker ===
Following 888poker's upgrade of its mobile app in July 2013, the company's then CEO, Brian Mattingly, revealed in an interview that 888poker's strong sales growth comes from the expanding mobile poker market. Mattingly stated that 17% of 888's UK wagers in general are placed on mobile devices and hoped that the company's UK mobile share would double in the next year and a half.

=== 888poker Club ===
888poker's loyalty programme, the 888poker Club, features daily free tournaments and offers players a chance to win $100,000 each month. Players also receive scratchcards for every five levels they climb.

== The 888poker team ==
A variety of professional poker players and celebrities act as brand ambassadors for 888poker. Among the prominent persons who have joined Team 888poker are Dominik Nitsche, Martin Jacobson, Chris Moorman, Sofia Lövgren, Kara Scott, Natalie Hof, Parker Talbot, Vivian Saliba former Australian international cricket bowler Shane Warne, UFC Welterweight champion George St. Pierre, and the former footballer Denílson.

Uruguayan footballer Luis Suárez also signed a contract with 888poker in 2014. However, the partnership was dissolved due to the events of the 2014 World Cup.

== Live poker tournaments ==
=== 888poker Live and XL Championships Series ===
888poker hosts the 888poker Live event several times a year, a series of poker tournaments held in several cities around the world. In addition, 888poker organizes three online legends - XL Inferno, XL Eclipse and XL Blizzard - collectively known as the XL Championships Series.

=== World Series of Poker ===
888poker is the main sponsor and the exclusive organizer of qualifying rounds since 2014 for World Series of Poker in Las Vegas.

=== Super High Roller Bowl ===
In 2016, 2017 and 2018, 888poker was the main sponsor of the Super High Roller Bowl hosted by Poker Central at the Aria Resort & Casino in Las Vegas. This tournament was a buy-in of US$300,000, the second most expensive and the most expensive 2017 poker tournament worldwide.

=== World Poker Tour ===
In November 2017, 888poker and the World Poker Tour (WPT) entered into a partnership that immediately enabled all players on 888poker to qualify directly for the WPT DeepStacks in Berlin. On 11 February 2019, WPT announced a new partnership with 888poker, which will see two new events added to the WPTDeepStacks Europe schedule. One in Malta and one in Portugal.

=== 888 Poker LIVE Sochi ===
In August 2019, 888poker held 888 Poker LIVE Sochi. It was the first event 888poker in Russia. Russian poker player Vasily Tsapko became the winner of 888poker LIVE Main Event and won nearly $200k in cash.
