= David Oppenheim (poker player) =

American poker player (born 1973)

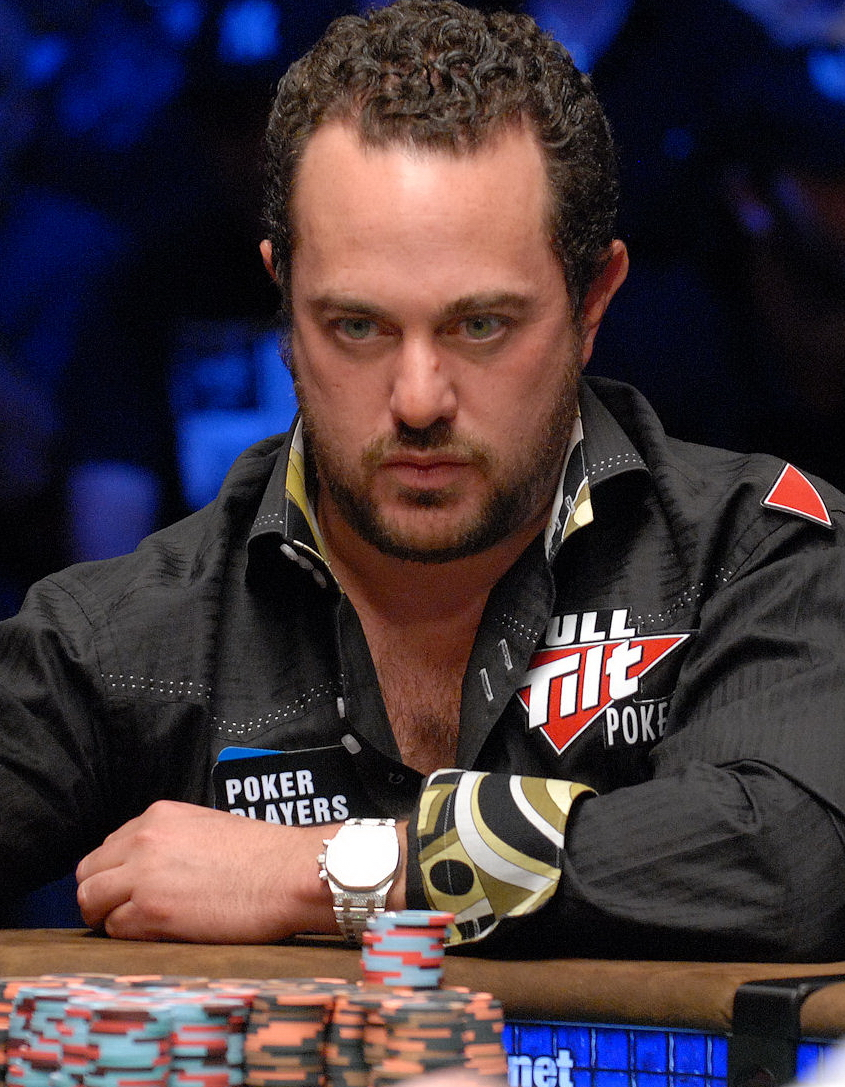
- Oppenheim at the 2010 World Series of Poker
- Nickname: Hall of Fame Dave/ /Oppy/The Big opp/ Big O/ The Big Dave/ The Hall of Famer/ Dave Dave
- Born: March 7, 1973 (age 53)

World Series of Poker
- Bracelet: None
- Money finishes: 10

World Poker Tour
- Title: None
- Final table: 1
- Money finishes: 11

David Oppenheim (born March 7, 1973) is an American professional poker player.

Oppenheim is from Calabasas, California. He started playing live cash games at 16, underaged, at the Bicycle Card Club (now known as the famous Bicycle Casino). He dropped college (Cal State Northridge) to start his poker career around the age of 19. He became known as one of the greatest cash games players of all time, and also became a representative of Full Tilt Poker. In 2019, David Oppenheim got inducted into the Poker Hall of Fame. As of 2021, his winnings in live poker tournaments are close to $2,000,000.

== Poker career ==
During the second season of the World Poker Tour (WPT), he placed third in the No-Limit Hold 'em Championship at the Borgata Poker Open in Atlantic City, earning $117,500 and third at the 2010 World Series of Poker (WSOP) in the $50,000 The Poker Players Championship Event, earning $603,348. In 2011 he finished first in the Australian poker series, 'Aussie Millions' with a cash prize of $250,000. It was a strictly invitational event where each player had to pay a fee of $25,000 to enter.

David Oppenheim is a regular in the world famous high stakes cash room at the Bellagio, Bobby's Room (now renamed Legends Room) where he plays stakes as high as $4,000/$8,000.

== Movie and TV appearances ==
Oppenheim also had some exposure in motion pictures and television. In 2007, he had a brief cameo role as the character "Josh Cohen" in the 2007 film Lucky You.

In January 2008, Oppenheim appeared on the third season of NBC's Poker After Dark in the episode "19th Hole".
