= Tom Marchese =

American poker player (born 1987)

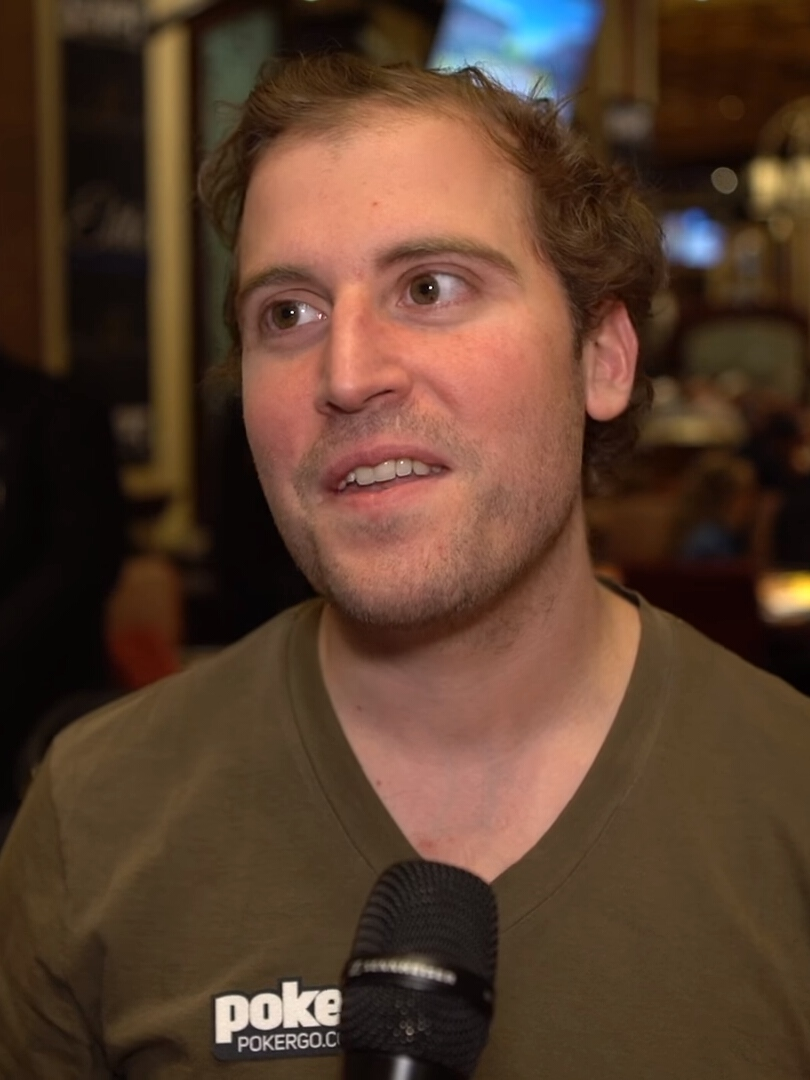
- Marchese in 2018
- Born: September 30, 1987 (age 39); Parsippany, New Jersey, U.S.

World Series of Poker
- Bracelet: 1
- Money finishes: 19
- Highest WSOP Main Event finish: 14th, 2016

World Poker Tour
- Title: None
- Final tables: 2
- Money finishes: 4

European Poker Tour
- Title: None
- Final table: 1
- Money finish: 1

Thomas Marchese (born September 30, 1987) is an American professional poker player from Parsippany, New Jersey. Marchese lives in Las Vegas, Nevada.

== Poker career ==
Marchese was the winner of the 2010 Card Player Player of the Year. During 2010, Marchese made 11 final tables and won the NAPT event at The Venetian. In 2015, Marchese won back-to-back 'High Roller' events at the Aria casino in Las Vegas, netting $681,876.

As of 2017, Marchese's live tournament winnings exceed $15,700,000.

On July 3, 2019, Marchese won the MILLIONS Vegas event at the Aria Resort and Casino for $1m, the inaugural partypokerLIVE MILLIONS event to be held in the USA. This was Marchese's third cash for at least $1,000,000 at the Aria.

On Full Tilt Poker, Marchese used to play very high stakes NLHE under the name "Kingsofcards."

=== World Series of Poker bracelets ===
Year	Tournament	Prize (US$)
2023	$1,000 No-Limit Hold'em 6-Max Championship Online	$195,963

=== Style ===
Marchese plays according to newschool thoughts of c-betting as betting your hand after the flop with every hand that put in a raise before the flop.
