= Danielle Andersen =

American poker player (born 1984)

- Nickname: dmoongirl
- Born: May 21, 1984 (age 42)

World Series of Poker
- Bracelet: None
- Final table: 1
- Money finishes: 4

World Poker Tour
- Title: None
- Final table: None
- Money finish: 1

Danielle Andersen (born May 21, 1984) is an American professional poker player previously sponsored by Ultimate Poker. Andersen's competitive nature led her to pick up the game after watching her future husband, and friends, play in college in 2003. Finding herself winning on a regular basis, she made a $50 deposit and never looked back.

Andersen's nickname is “dmoongirl.” She regularly played $25–$50 six-max cash games online, and at times participated in higher-stakes games, including $200–$400, prior to the events of Black Friday. She appeared as one of the featured players in the documentary “Bet Raise Fold,” which followed aspects of her life as a professional poker player alongside her roles as a wife and mother. The film contributed to increased recognition of her within the poker community.

While Andersen is primarily a cash game player she has played in some WPT and WSOP events. Her live tournament earnings total $136,180

In compliment to her poker career, upon signing with Ultimate Poker "dmoongirl" took her experience in front of the camera and became the face of Ultimate Poker's web series, ME vs. U. In ME vs. U, Andersen competes against fellow Ultimate Poker pro, Dan O'Brien in challenges. The winner gets a reward and the loser is punished.

== Personal life ==
Danielle Andersen was born and raised in Minnesota. In 2014, Andersen moved to Las Vegas, Nevada with her family to pursue her online poker career with the United States' first regulated online poker site, Ultimate Poker. Her early adult life was captured on film in the documentary "Bet Raise Fold." A film about the coming of age of online poker, Andersen's life story unfolded. She was born and raised in rural Minnesota where she lived with her husband, Kory, and son, Easton. She has been supporting her family with online poker since 2004. Bluff Magazine named her one of poker's "Leading Ladies." BET RAISE FOLD followed Danielle as she pursued her dreams of sponsorship in order to secure a better future for her family. Years after the documentary premiered, Andersen signed a sponsorship deal with Ultimate Poker.

== Poker ==
Andersen has been playing poker since 2004 focusing mainly on Texas Hold'em cash games. Although online poker is her focus, Andersen also plays some live poker as well. During the summers, she can be found playing tournaments at the World Series of Poker as well as cash games.

Andersen is a frequent guest on the TV show Poker Night in America.
