= David Grey =

American poker player

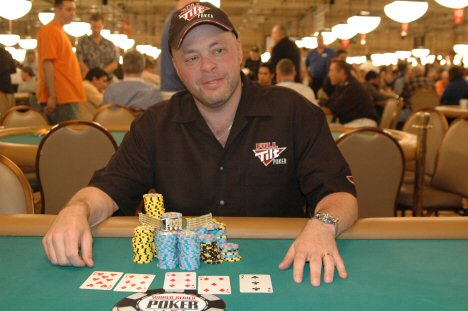
- Grey in the 2005 World Series of Poker
- Nickname: Vegas Stud

World Series of Poker
- Bracelets: 2
- Money finishes: 15
- Highest WSOP Main Event finish: 8th, 2003

World Poker Tour
- Title: None
- Final table: None
- Money finishes: 8

David F. Grey is an American professional poker player from Henderson, Nevada.

Grey is best known as a cash-game specialist, though he has also achieved several notable poker tournament results.

He has won two bracelets at the World Series of Poker (WSOP), the first in the 1999 Seven-Card Stud event and the second in the 2005 No Limit Deuce to Seven Draw event.

In 2003, Grey reached the final table of the $10,000 No Limit Texas hold 'em Main Event, finishing eighth and earning $160,000.

Grey has also appeared on several televised poker programs. He competed in the second seasons of both the Poker Superstars Invitational Tournament and High Stakes Poker, and finished second to Daniel Negreanu on Poker After Dark.

As of 2009, Grey’s total live tournament winnings exceed $1.5 million. His 15 cashes at the WSOP account for $913,691 of those earnings.

== World Series of Poker bracelets ==
Year	Tournament	Prize (US$)
1999	$2,500 Seven Card Stud	$199,000
2005	$5,000 No Limit 2 to 7 Draw Lowball	$365,135
