= Marco Traniello =

Italian poker player (born 1973)

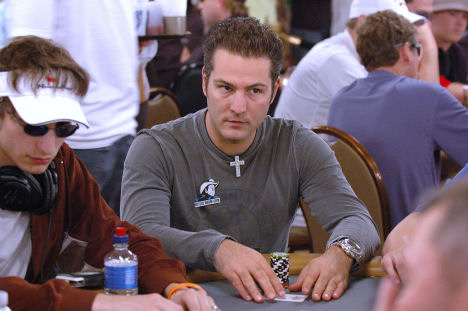
- Traniello at the 2007 World Series of Poker.
- Born: 14 August 1973 (age 53)

World Series of Poker
- Bracelet: None
- Money finishes: 27
- Highest WSOP Main Event finish: None

World Poker Tour
- Title: None
- Final table: None
- Money finishes: 4

Marco Traniello (born 14 August 1973, in Gaeta) is an Italian professional hairdresser and was a sponsored professional poker player on Full Tilt Poker.

== Poker ==
Traniello made his first appearance at the World Series of Poker (WSOP) in 2005, finishing in the money in seven different events (tied for the most money finishes in the 2005 WSOP with Michael Mizrachi and Tony Cousineau). Amongst these money finishes, Traniello made the final table of the $2,000 pot limit hold'em event.

He played in the 2005 World Speed Poker Open in London and cashed in the $15,000 no limit hold'em main event of the World Poker Tour Five Diamond World Poker Classic.

Traniello writes for Card Player Magazine and is a member of Marcel Lüske's Circle of Outlaws.

At the 2007 World Series of Poker, he made it to the final table in the $10,000 Pot Limit Omaha event. He finished 5th, winning $156,435, his biggest win to date.

As of January 2015, his total live tournament winnings exceed $700,000. His 27 cashes at the WSOP account for $489,220 of those winnings.

== Personal life ==
Prior to working as a professional poker player, Traniello was a real estate agent and the captain of an oil ship.
