= Keith Lehr =

American poker player (born 1963)

Charles Keith Lehr, Jr.
- Born: November 1963 (age 62–63); Bossier City, Louisiana, USA

World Series of Poker
- Bracelets: 2
- Final tables: 5
- Money finishes: 20
- Highest WSOP Main Event finish: 266th, 2009

World Poker Tour
- Title: None
- Final table: None
- Money finishes: 3

Charles Keith Lehr, Jr., known as Keith Lehr (born November 1963) is an American poker player from his native Bossier City, Louisiana, who is a two-time World Series of Poker bracelet winner.

== Poker career ==
Lehr won his first bracelet at the 2003 World Series of Poker in the $3,000 Pot Limit Hold'em event. His second bracelet came in the 2015 World Series of Poker Heads-up No Limit event earning $334,430.

Lehr (using the nickname "cheesemonster") won the Full Tilt Online Poker Series Main Event in May 2008, winning $410,780.

Lehr largest cashed was for $701,757 at the 2012 World Series of Poker $10,000 No-Limit Hold'em (Six Handed) event.

As of 2023, his earnings exceeded $4,300,000.
