= Jason Somerville =

American poker player (born 1987)

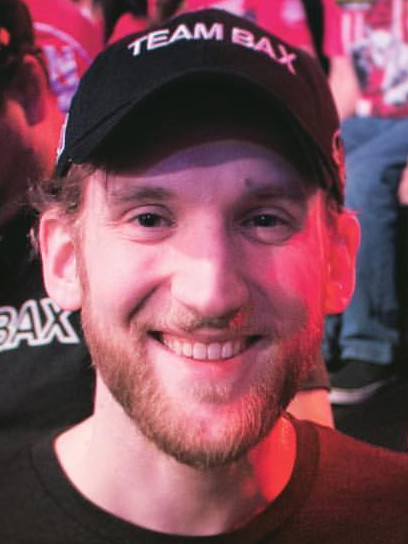
- Somerville in 2016
- Nicknames: jcarverpoker (PokerStars), Jcarver (Full Tilt), Taknapotin (former Pokerstars), haderade (WSOP.com)
- Born: April 15, 1987 (age 39); Long Island, New York

World Series of Poker
- Bracelet: 1
- Final tables: 5
- Money finishes: 27
- Highest WSOP Main Event finish: 63rd, 2020

World Poker Tour
- Title: None
- Final table: 1
- Money finishes: 4

European Poker Tour
- Title: None
- Final table: None
- Money finishes: 2

Jason Scott 'JCarver' Somerville (born April 15, 1987) is an American poker player specializing in Texas Hold'em. He has one World Series of Poker bracelet and 3.9 million in live tournament results. He is the founder of Run It UP, a video/live stream series where viewers are encouraged to "watch, listen, and learn as he turns $50 into $10,000".

He has been a contributor to the PokerVT training team as an advanced instructor in poker tournaments and a "Ones to Watch" for the World Poker Tour XI Season.

== Career ==
Somerville discovered poker in 2004 while watching the World Poker Tour with his dad on television. Shortly thereafter, he began researching the game on the internet and playing locally with friends. Graduating from high school that year, a year early, he began playing freeroll tournaments online hoping to emerge into real money poker. In doing so, he turned "free" money into a six-figure bankroll without ever making a single deposit.

From the ages of 18-20, Somerville added live tournaments to his online schedule where he was legally able to do so. He has played at the World Series of Poker every year since turning 21, as well as many other tournaments around the world, gaining increasing success and notoriety with each year. In 2013, Jason Somerville signed as a sponsored Pro with Ultimate Poker, the official gaming partner of the UFC.

In 2008, Somerville joined the PokerVT training team as an instructor in the advanced poker tournament arena. In 2012, the World Poker Tour named him a "Ones to Watch" for their eleventh season (2012–2013). On February 27, 2015, Jason was announced as a Team Pokerstars Pro.

=== Online Poker ===
Somerville has over 250 online tournament "in the money" finishes, totaling over $2.2 million in online tournament winnings. In 2009, he cashed his first Spring Championship of Online Poker event earning $35,140 for a 20th-place finish and cashed in five World Championship of Online Poker events, including one final table, for a combined $21,760. In 2010, he won his first SCOOP event and cashed in five others, including another final table finish, for $448,421 and three WCOOP events for $19,100.

In April 2011, online poker was shut down in the USA. Somerville was mostly absent from online tournament poker until 2013 when Ultimate Poker brought legalized and regulated online poker back to America, having chosen not to relocate out of the country. Jason played on Ultimate Poker until it was shut down in 2014 because the Nevada-based site's revenues fell far short of projected expectations.

In September 2012, Somerville cashed in six WCOOP events, including two final tables, for $31,453.

==== Ultimate Poker ====
On May 31, 2013, Somerville, Jonathan Little, and William Reynolds joined Antonio Esfandiari as the first members of the Ultimate Poker team.

In October 2014, Somerville and Ultimate Poker parted ways. The parting was due to financial consequences created by Ultimate Poker's withdrawal from the New Jersey market.

=== Live Poker ===
Year	Total	2005	2006	2007	2008	2009	2010	2011	2012	2013	2014
Worldwide Results	$3,900,480	$451	$555	$31,934	$17,869	$425,794	$722,384	$525,274	$783,703	$19,120	$1,747,352

==== WSOP ====
In 2008, Somerville played his first World Series of Poker schedule, cashing in three No Limit Hold'em events for $16,027. In 2009, he cashed in 3 No-Limit Hold'em events for $311,786 with 2 final table finishes. In 2010, he cashed in four No-Limit Hold'em events for $640,904 with 2 final table finishes and his first WSOP Main Event. In 2011, Jason won his first bracelet in a $1,000 No Limit Texas Hold'em event, defeating a field of 3,175 players, and cashed in one other No-Limit Hold'em event that year for $525,274. In 2012, he cashed in 3 No-Limit Hold'em events for $124,683, including his deepest yet run in the WSOP Main Event placing 69th of 6,598 players. That same summer he also placed 3rd in No Limit Hold'em satellite tournament to the Big One for One Drop $1,000,000 buy-in tournament for $400,000.

Overall, as of 2020, Jason Somerville has cashed in 28 World Series events for a total of $1,733,859.

==== Other Notable Events ====
In April 2009, Somerville placed 19th in the €10,000 EPT No Limit Hold'em Grand Final in Monte Carlo for $68,372. In October later that year, he placed 73rd in the EPT €5,000 No Limit Hold'em Main event in London for $14,646. In January 2010, he placed 4th in the Poker Caribbean Adventures $5,000 No Limit Hold'em tournament for $81,480. In February 2012, he made the final table, placing 6th, of the World Poker Tour Los Angeles Poker Classic $10,000 No Limit Hold'em tournament for $202,910. In June 2014, Somerville FYF'd a 100k High Roller tournament at the Bellagio and chopped into 4th place money for $1,327,352.

=== Online poker content ===
Somerville began his online video career creating strategy videos for PokerVT in 2011.

Somerville posted his first YouTube series titled "Eating Cake" to YouTube on December 2, 2011. The series lasted 30 episodes, with the final episode being published on February 13, 2012. After Russell Thomas made the final table of the 2012 WSOP Main Event, he contacted Somerville to help him prepare during the three months leading up to the October 28 event. Somerville chronicled the experience in a six-episode documentary series titled "The Final Table".

Since August 2013, Somerville has periodically released videos for a series titled "STORYTIME: Life and Times of J. Carver" in which he tells the story of how his career in poker began and has progressed throughout the years. Also discussed is the origin of the name "JCarver". The series currently sits at six parts, although Somerville has expressed interest in creating more videos for the series in the future.

On April 14, 2014, PokerNews announced that Somerville would cohost the live hour-long PokerNews Podcast every Monday, Wednesday, and Friday during the 2014 World Series of Poker, available on YouTube.

In April 2018, Somerville appeared on Stones Gambling Hall’s live stream of a $5/$10/$20 No Limit Hold’em cash game as a commentator along with poker streamer Lex Veldhuis.

=== Run It Up ===
As of early 2014, Somerville has focused on live-streaming poker sessions for Run It Up on his Twitch channel. He was signed to Team PokerStars and began Season 3 of his Twitch stream on March 1, 2015. Somerville took a break from streaming on Twitch starting May 21, 2017, causing his followers to question if and when he would return to that venue, but he returned in August 2018.

== Personal life ==
Somerville was born and raised in Long Island, New York. While signed with Ultimate Poker from 2013-2014, he has resided in Las Vegas. In early 2015 he moved to Toronto so he could play on PokerStars, which is not available in the United States.

On Valentine's Day of 2012, Somerville came out as gay in a blog post. He is the first, and currently the only, openly gay high-stakes male player. He has found great support both from within the poker community and from media outlets outside of the world of poker, including Perez Hilton and The Advocate.
