= Global Poker Index =

Poker leaderboard index

Global Poker Index (GPI)
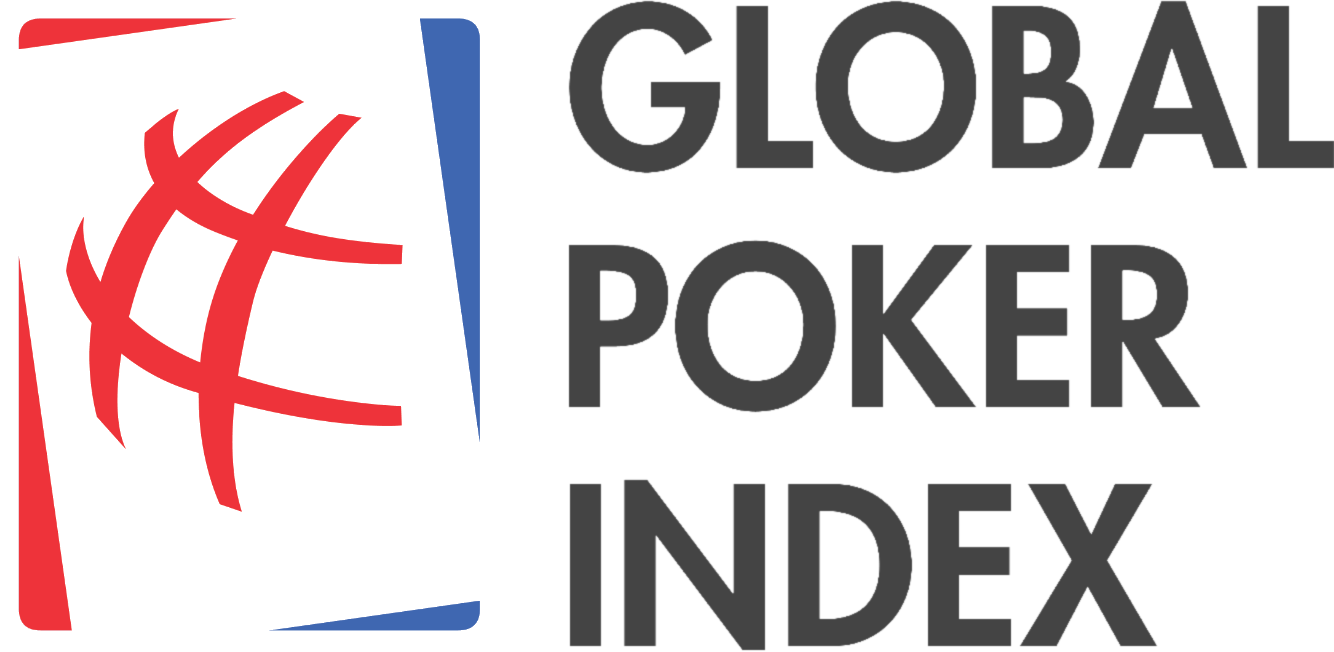
- Sport: Poker
- Founded: 2011
- Owner: Alexandre Dreyfus
- President: Eric Danis
- Motto: The Poker Ranking Authority
- Most recent champion: Bin Weng
- Website: GlobalPokerIndex.com

The Global Poker Index (GPI) is a leaderboard index that ranks over 450,000 live tournament poker players in the world. The GPI poker rankings are updated on a weekly basis. Players’ performances are assessed by their finishing positions in poker tournaments occurring over six periods of six months (3 years).

The Global Poker Index uses data from the biggest poker database The Hendon Mob, known for collecting results of tournaments around the world and for being the reference in tournament results. They currently host results for over 325,000 poker tournaments.

The index is used in famous newspapers along with sports results to communicate poker rankings, both on the online and print version.

== History ==
The Global Poker Index was originally created by Federated Sports + Gaming, along with the Epic Poker League(EPL), with Former World Series of Poker (WSOP) commissioner Jeffrey Pollack acting as the executive chairman, professional poker player Annie Duke as commissioner, and Matt Savage as the League's tournament director. The GPI was employed to rank players for the EPL and decide which players could take part in the League. On 29 February 2012, when Federated Sports + Gaming announced that they had filed for Bankruptcy, all of the organizations and all the brands were acquired by Pinnacle Entertainment, Inc., at a bankruptcy auction in June 2012. Following this acquisition, Zokay Entertainment and the company's CEO, Alexandre Dreyfus acquired the GPI brand, along with its patent-pending formula, in order to create a single, unified ranking platform covering the live tournament poker world in its entirety.

== The GPI ranking system ==
The GPI tracks players' results for their prior 3 years of play, in qualifying tournaments with 32 or more entrants (specialty events and freerolls are not counted), using a patent-pending formula that takes into account result ages, field difficulties, and field sizes to generate live tournament player rankings.

For each qualifying tournament a player finishes in-the-money they receive a GPI score. Those scores fall into one of six time periods, each of which covers a half-year based on the starting date of the tournament. These are called GPI Aging Periods. The sum of the player's largest five (5) scores for each of the two Aging Periods in the most recent year and their four (4) largest scores for the four Aging Periods prior to that is their total GPI score. GPI scores themselves are calculated by multiplying a Buy-in Factor, Finishing Factor, and Aging Factor.

The Buy-in Factor is the GPI's measure of relative difficulty, presuming larger buy-ins draw a more skilled field. Its median is calculated by dividing the USD equivalent of a $1,000 buy-in (fee included) by 1,000. This results in a Buy-in Factor of 1.0 for a $1,000 tournament, with Buy-in Factors being larger or smaller than 1.0 depending on whether the buy-in is larger or smaller than $1,000. This calculation uses a logarithmic function. It does so because the incremental increase in the skill set of the field theoretically diminishes as the buy-in amount increases. For example, in the GPI formula the percentage increase of GPI's Buy-In Factor between a $1500 event and an $2000 event is much greater than its percentage increase between $19,500 and a $20,000 buy-in events. Furthermore, all tournaments with a buy-in larger than $20,000 are treated as though the buy-in was only $20,000 and all tournaments with a buy-in smaller than $400 are treated as though the buy-in was $400.

The GPI also includes a Finishing Factor, which measures how players perform relative to the rest of the field they compete with in any given poker tournament. This Finishing Factor is calculated initially by dividing the field size by the player's finishing position and is also done using a logarithmic function. Furthermore, for any tournaments with a field size larger than 2,700 players will be treated as though their field was only 2,700. The GPI also employs an Aging Factor to player results. This is a multiplier that gives more points to tournaments based on how recently they were played in order to reward players both for recent success and consistency over time. Each Aging Period consists of 6 month periods of time, with the most recent being the previous 6 months from the present, and going backwards from there through to a point 3 years in the past. Each Aging Period has a different multiplier that is applied to score calculations, with multipliers decreasing as each Aging Period becomes less recent.

=== National and regional rankings ===
The Global Poker Index National Rankings ranks players by Country, with 20 different national rankings are currently available, by North American, Latin American, European, and Asian regions as well. The GPI is used as a central reference point when ranking live tournament poker players including France, Italy, Spain, Brazil, Latin America and the USA.

=== Poker team rankings ===
The GPI create rankings of players comprising professional poker teams to show which teams’ players have the best overall results. Ranked teams include PokerStars, Winamax and Party Poker.

== Former Number Ones ==
- Jason Mercier
- Bertrand Grospellier
- Erik Seidel
- Dan Smith
- Marvin Rettenmaier
- Ole Schemion
- Daniel Negreanu
- Vanessa Selbst
- Scott Seiver
- Anthony Zinno
- Byron Kaverman
- Steve O'Dwyer
- Fedor Holz
- David Peters
- Nick Petrangelo
- Bryn Kenney
- Adrián Mateos
- Stephen Chidwick
- Alex Foxen
- Joe McKeehen
- Nick Pupillo
- Adam Hendrix
- Ali Imsirovic
- Shannon Shorr
- Chance Kornuth
- Chad Eveslage
- Jeremy Ausmus
- Nacho Barbero
- Bin Weng

== GPI Player Of the Year ==
The GPI Player Of the Year (POY) award is given to the player topping GPI's Player of the Year Leaderboard at the end of each calendar year. Standings are updated weekly with the top 1,000 contenders ranked according to results, with the Leaderboard utilizing an augmented version of GPI's existing ranking formula which disregards aging factors and includes 11 total results from qualifying tournament results in each given year (top 6 results from the first 6 months of the year and top 5 results from these 6 months of each year). Buy in restrictions, minimum player field restrictions are kept as-is.

In 2021, the GPI Mid-Major Player of the Year was introduced and included all eligible open events $2,500 and below with a minimum of 32 entries.

Player of the Year

- POY 2012: Dan Smith
- POY 2013: Ole Schemion
- POY 2014: Daniel Colman
- POY 2015: Byron Kaverman
- POY 2016: David Peters
- POY 2017: Adrián Mateos
- POY 2018: Alex Foxen
- POY 2019: Alex Foxen
- POY 2021: Ali Imsirovic
- POY 2022: Stephen Song
- POY 2023: Bin Weng
- POY 2024: David Coleman
- POY 2025: Punnat Punsri

Female Player of the Year

- Female POY 2014: Vanessa Selbst
- Female POY 2015: Kelly Minkin
- Female POY 2016: Cate Hall
- Female POY 2017: Kristen Foxen
- Female POY 2018: Kristen Foxen
- Female POY 2019: Kristen Foxen
- Female POY 2021: Nadya Magnus
- Female POY 2022: Cherish Andrews
- Female POY 2023: Kristen Foxen
- Female POY 2024: Cherish Andrews
- Female POY 2025: Kristen Foxen

Mid-Major Player of the Year

- Mid-Major POY 2021: David Mzareulov
- Mid-Major POY 2022: Stephen Song
- Mid-Major POY 2023: Nick Pupillo
- Mid-Major POY 2024: Han Feng
- Mid Major POY 2025: Omar Lakhdari

== Global poker masters ==
The Global Poker Index aggregates the Top 300 performing players in the world and groups them by nationality to create GPI Country Rankings to show how many top players hail from specific nations. Currently the US is the world's top performing country in terms of live tournament player results, with over 50% of all Top 300 GPI ranked players being American. Using the country rankings, the Global Poker Masters will be a world cup of poker, gathering the best players from 9 countries around the world, in order to decide which country is the best.

== Awards ==
The Global Poker Index is the host of the European Poker Awards. The GPI EPA takes place every year in January and rewards the best European Poker Players and newcomers, as well as the people involved in the industry.

Starting in 2015, the American Poker Awards took place in Los Angeles, USA, and rewarded the best live poker players in America, as well as the biggest contributors in the industry.

Starting in 2019, the Global Poker Index announced the 1st Annual Global Poker Awards to be held on April 5, 2019. The event would combine multiple awards programs, including the American Poker Awards and European Poker Awards.

=== 2019 Global Poker Awards ===
The 1st Annual Global Poker Awards presented by PokerStars for the 2018 poker season was held on April 5, 2019, at the PokerGO Studio at ARIA Resort & Casino. There were 20 awards presented, and the show was aired on PokerGO and was hosted by Ali Nejad and Drea Renae. Winners are listed first, highlighted in boldface, and indicated with a double dagger (‡).

| **GPI Poker Player of the Year**: **Alex Foxen‡** | **GPI Female Poker Player of the Year**: **Kristen Bicknell**‡ |
| **GPI Breakout Player**: **Ali Imsirovic**‡; Maria Konnikova; Ping Liu; Michael Soyza | **Event of the Year**: **WSOP Main Event‡**; Super High Roller Bowl IV; partypoker Caribbean Poker Party Main Event; WPT Five Diamond World Poker Classic |
| **Tournament Performance of the Year**: **John Cynn - WSOP Main Event**‡; Justin Bonomo - Super High Roller Bowl IV; Maria Lampropulos - PCA Main Event; Dylan Linde - WPT Five Diamond World Poker Classic | **Mid-Major Tour/Circuit of the Year**: **RUNGOOD Poker Series**‡; 888poker Live; Unibet Open; WPTDeepStacks; WSOP Circuit |
| **Moment of the Year**: **Justin Bonomo Wins Big One for One Drop, completing Super High Roller streak (SHRB China, SHRB IV, One Drop)**‡; Jeremy Hilsercop receives PSPC Platinum Pass; Joe Cada wins WSOP The Closer; registering for the event moments after 5th place finish in the WSOP Main Event; Doyle Brunson plays his final WSOP event | **Podcast of the Year**: **The Chip Race Poker Podcast - David Lappin and Dara O'Kearney**‡; LFG Podcast - Chad Holloway and Jamie Kerstetter; PokerCentral Podcast - Brent Hanks and Remko Rinkema; PokerNews Podcast - Sarah Herring; The Fives - Lance Bradley and Donnie Peters for PocketFives |
| **Streamer of the Year**: **Lex Veldhuis**‡; Jeff Gross; Jason Somerville; Jaime Staples | **Vlogger of the Year**: **Andrew Neeme**‡; Marle Cordeiro; Joey Ingram; Daniel Negreanu; Doug Polk |
| **Industry Person of the Year**: **Angelica Hael - WPT**‡; Cary Katz - PokerCentral; Matt Savage - WPT; Ty Stewart - WSOP; Rob Yong - Dusk Till Dawn | **Tournament Director of the Year**: **Paul Campbell - ARIA**‡; Tony Burns - Seminole; Jack Effel - WSOP; Kenny Hallaert - Unibet Open |
| **Poker Broadcaster of the Year**: **Maria Ho**‡; Lon McEachern; Nick Schulman; Lex Veldhuis | **Poker Journalist of the Year**: **Sarah Herring**‡; Drew Amato; Remko Rinkema; Christian Zetzsche |
| **Media Content of the Year**: **Lance Bradley - "The Pursuit of Poker Success" book**‡; Drew Amato - "Doyle Brunson bids farewell to WSOP" photo; Haley Hintze - "Vayo v. PokerStars" article; PokerCentral/PokerGO - "Super High Roller Club: Schulman featuring Nejad" video | **People's Choice Award for Poker Personality of the Year**: **Brad Owen**‡; Jonathan Little; Johnnie Moreno; Lex Veldhuis |
| **PocketFives Legacy Award**: **Chris Moorman‡** | **Jury Prize**: **Drew Amato**‡ |
| **Lifetime Achievement Award**: **Doyle Brunson‡** | **Charitable Initiative Award**: **Robbie Strazynski‡** |

=== 2020 Global Poker Awards ===
The 2nd Annual Global Poker Awards for the 2019 poker season was held on March 6, 2020, at the PokerGO Studio at ARIA Resort & Casino. There were 25 awards presented, and the show was aired on PokerGO and was hosted by Maria Ho and Drea Renae. Winners are listed first, highlighted in boldface, and indicated with a double dagger (‡).

| **GPI Poker Player of the Year**: **Alex Foxen‡** | **GPI Female Poker Player of the Year**: **Kristen Bicknell**‡ |
| **GPI Breakout Player**: **Robert Campbell**‡; Ramon Colillas; Ben Farrell; George Wolff | **Players Choice for Toughest Opponent**: **Stephen Chidwick‡**; Michael Addamo; Kahle Burns; Ali Imsirovic |
| **Final Table Performance of the Year**: **Phillip Hui - WSOP $50k Poker Players Championship**‡; Hossein Ensan - WSOP Main Event; Alex Foxen - WPT Five Diamond World Poker Classic; Bryn Kenney - Triton Poker Super High Roller Series Montenegro | **Event of the Year**: **PokerStars Players Championship Bahamas - PokerStars**‡; Triton London Million for Charity - Triton Poker; World Series of Poker Main Event - WSOP; World Series of Poker Big 50 - WSOP |
| **Mid-Major Tour/Circuit of the Year**: **RUNGOOD Poker Series**‡; Road to PSPC; WPTDeepStacks; WSOP Circuit | **Twitter Personality**: **Jamie Kerstetter**‡; Barny Boatman; Kitty Kuo; Kevin Mathers |
| **Streamer of the Year**: **Lex Veldhuis**‡; Hristivoje Pavlovic; Benjamin Spragg; Matthew Staples | **Vlogger of the Year**: **Andrew Neeme**‡; Jaman Burton; Daniel Negreanu; Brad Owen |
| **Best Industry Person**: **Paul Phua - Triton Poker**‡; Phil Galfond - Run it Once Poker; Cary Katz - PokerGO; Matt Savage - WPT | **Tournament Director of the Year**: **Matt Savage - WPT**‡; Tony Burns - Seminole; Jack Effel - WSOP; Paul Campbell - ARIA |
| **Best Podcast**: **The Grid: Jennifer Shahade**‡; DAT Poker Podcast - Terrence Chan, Ross Henry, Adam Schwartz, and Daniel Negreanu; Poker Life Podcast - Joey Ingram; The Fives - Lance Bradley and Donnie Peters for PocketFives | **Broadcaster of the Year**: **Nick Schulman**‡; Jamie Kerstter; Jeff Platt; Joseph Stapleton |
| **Journalist of the Year**: **Joey Ingram**‡; Lance Bradley; Haley Hintze; Nick Jones | **Media Content of the Year: Written**: **Martin Harris - "Poker and Pop Culture" for D+B Publishing**‡; Lance Bradley - "A Fight for Fatherhood: The Biggest Win of Jason Young's Life" for PocketFives; Aleeyah Jadavji - "Kevin Roster Spread Sarcoma Awareness at WSOP, Wants to End Life on His Terms" for PokerNews; Paul Seaton - "The Unabridged Story of The Hendon Mob" for PokerNews |
| **Media Content of the Year: Photo**: **Drew Amato - "Dario Sammartino folds at the WSOP" for PokerGO**‡; Antonio Abrego - "Ryan Laplante in deep thought at WSOP" for PokerNews; Joe Giron - "WPT Champion Frank Steupchin is lifted in victory" for WPT; Hayley Hochstetler - "Doyle Brunson and Jack Binion at WSOP celebration" for WSOP | **Media Content of the Year: Video**: **Joey Ingram - "Investigating Mike Postle Hand Histories from Stones Live"**‡; PokerGO - "Legends of the Game: Stu Unger"; PokerGO - "The Big Blind with Jeff Platt featuring Mike Matusow, Norman Chad, Sarah Herring"; Sam Rega - "Who Makes Money from Professional Poker" for CNBC |
| **People's Choice for Hand of the Year**: **Ryan Riess makes 10-high all-in call at EPT Monte Carlo final table**‡; Bryce Yockey takes a historic hit against Josh Arieh in the WSOP Poker Players Championship; Sam Trickett makes Stephen Chidwick fold best hand at Triton London 1M event; Thi Xoa Nguyen folds full house to Athanasios Polychronopoulos at PSPC | **People's Choice Poker Personality of the Year**: **Jonathan Little‡**; Joey Ingram; Ryan Depaulo; Lex Veldhuis |
| **PocketFives Legacy Award**: **Shaun Deeb**‡ | **GPI Award of Merit**: **Timothy Duckworth - Tournament Live Reporters**‡ |
| **The Hendon Mob Award**: **John Cernuto**‡ | **Charitable Initiative Award**: **Scott Wellenbach‡** |
| **Poker ICON**: **Johnny Chan‡** | |

=== 2022 Global Poker Awards ===
The 3rd Annual Global Poker Awards for the 2021 poker season was held on February 18, 2022, at the PokerGO Studio at ARIA Resort & Casino. There were 26 awards presented, and the show was aired on PokerGO and was hosted by Jeff Platt and Drea Renae.

Winners are listed first, highlighted in boldface, and indicated with a double dagger (‡).

| **GPI Poker Player of the Year**: **Ali Imsirovic**‡ | **GPI Female Poker Player of the Year**: **Nadya Magnus**‡ |
| **GPI Mid-Major Player of the Year**: **David Mzareulov**‡ | **PGT Player of the Year**: **Ali Imsirovic**‡ |
| **Best Final Table Performance**: **Adam Friedman - WSOP $10k Dealer's Choice Championship**‡; Koray Aldemir - WSOP Main Event; Jeremy Ausmus - WSOP PLO High Roller; Daniel Cates - WSOP $50k Poker Players Championship | **GPI Breakout Player**: **Johan Guilbert**‡; Chris Brewer; Kyna England; Vanessa Kade |
| **Players' Choice for Toughest Opponent**: **Ali Imsirovic**‡; Michael Addamo; Stephen Chidwick; David Peters | **Twitter Personality**: **Jamie Kerstetter**‡; Will Jaffe; Kitty Kuo; Kevin Mathers |
| **Best Streamer**: **Benjamin Spragg**‡; Kevin Martin; Jonathan Van Fleet; Lex Veldhuis | **Best Vlogger**: **Brad Owen**‡; Jaman Burton; Ryan Depaulo; Ethan Yau |
| **Best Industry Person**: **Matt Savage - WPT**‡; Tony Burns - Seminole; Jack Effel - WSOP; Mori Eskandani - PokerGO | **Best Tournament Director**: **Paul Campbell - ARIA**‡; Justin Hammer - various; Ray Pulford - Wynn Las Vegas; Andy Tillman - various |
| **Best Event**: **World Series of Poker Main Event - WSOP**‡; Rock 'N' Roll Poker Open Opening Event - Seminole Hard Rock; Wynn Mystery Bounty (Summer) - Wynn Las Vegas; Wynn Millions - Wynn Las Vegas | **Best Podcast**: **Poker in the Ears - James Hartigan and Joseph Stapleton for PokerStars**‡; The Chip Race Poker Podcast - David Lappin and Dara O'Kearney for Unibet Poker; The Doug Polk Podcast - Doug Polk; The Heart of Poker - Kara Scott |
| **Best Broadcaster**: **Jeff Platt**‡; Jamie Kerstetter; Ali Nejad; Joseph Stapleton | **Best Live Reporter**: **Christian Zetzsche**‡; Merom Doft; Timothy Duckworth; Chad Holloway |
| **Best Media Content: Written**: **Lance Bradley - "Isai Scheinberg: His Company, His Legacy, and How Black Friday Impacted Both" for PocketFives**‡; Alex O'Brien - "How a $10k poker win changed how I think" for BBC; D'Arcy Maine - "While battling brain cancer, Michael Graydon lives World Series of Poker dream" for ESPN.com; Charles Rabin - "From immigration 'cage' to newest poker champ at Hard Rock. An Afghan refugee's luck turns" for Miami Herald | **Best Media Content: Photo**: **Enrique Malfavon - "The WSOP Main Event Bubble Bursts" for PokerGO**‡; Antonio Abrego - "Adam Friedman defeats Phil Hellmuth for 3rd straight WSOP $10k Dealer's Choice title" for PokerGO; Hayley Hochstetler - "The End of an Era"; Danny Maxwell - "Brandon Shack-Harris and his umbrella at WSOP" for PokerNews/WSOP |
| **Best Media Content: Video**: **Remko Rinkema - "Run it Back with Stefanie Ungar" for PokerGO**‡; Paul Guyer and Andrew Neeme - The Villain Who Stole Christmas; Last Call Pokeridokumentii; Jeff Platt - "Stand Up for Me, Please!" for PokerGO; Run It Once: Meet The Jungleman | **Fans Choice: Best Hand**: **Doug Polk makes epic fold versus Phil Hellmuth on High Stakes Poker**‡; Daniel Cates gets Ryan Leng to fold in $50k Poker Players Championship; Nicholas Rigby pulls monster bluff during late stages of WSOP Main Event; Quads over quads on Day 3 of the WSOP Main Event |
| **Fans Choice: Best Trophy**: **Mike Sexton WPT Champions Cup‡**; MSPT South Dakota State Championship; Seminole Hard Rock Poker Open Championship; WPTDeepStacks Gold Coast | **Fans Choice: Poker Personality**: **Masato Yokosawa**‡; Johan Guilbert; Greg Liow; Jonathan Little |
| **GPI Award of Merit**: **Maria Konnikova**‡ | **The Hendon Mob Award**: **Kevin Mathers**‡ |
| **Charitable Initiative Award**: **Veronica Brill‡** | **Poker ICON**: **Mike Sexton‡** |

=== 2023 Global Poker Awards ===
The 4th Annual Global Poker Awards for the 2022 poker season was held on March 3, 2023, at the PokerGO Studio at ARIA Resort & Casino. There were 27 awards presented, and the show was aired on PokerGO and was hosted by Jeff Platt and Drea Renae.

Winners are listed first, highlighted in boldface, and indicated with a double dagger (‡).

| **GPI Poker Player of the Year**: **Stephen Song**‡ | **GPI Female Poker Player of the Year**: **Cherish Andrews**‡ |
| **GPI Mid-Major Player of the Year**: **Stephen Song**‡ | **PGT Player of the Year**: **Stephen Chidwick‡** |
| **Best Final Table Performance**: **Daniel Cates - WSOP $50k Poker Players Championship**‡; Espen Jorstad - WSOP Main Event; Daniel Negreanu - Super High Roller Bowl VII; Stephen Song - WPT Prime Championship | **GPI Breakout Player**: **Angela Jordison**‡; Espen Jorstad; Alejandro Lococo; Punnat Punsri; Ethan Yau |
| **Comeback Player**: **Phil Ivey**‡; Alex Keating; Taylor von Kriegenbergh; Daniel Weinman | **Players' Choice for Toughest Opponent**: **Stephen Chidwick**‡; Brian Altman; Alex Foxen; Stephen Song |
| **Twitter Personality**: **Will Jaffe‡**; Phil Galfond; Jamie Kerstetter; Marle Spragg | **Best Streamer**: **Kevin Martin**‡; Benjamin Spragg; Jonathan Van Fleet; Lex Veldhuis |
| **Best Vlogger**: **Ethan Yau**‡; Jaman Burton; Mariano Grandoli; Brad Owen | **Rising Star in Content Creation**: **Caitlin Comeskey**‡; Natalie Bode; Jesse Fullen; Lexy Gavin-Mather |
| **Best Industry Person**: **Jack Effel - WSOP**‡; Ryan Beauregard - Wynn Las Vegas; Mori Eskandani - PokerGO; Tana Karn - RUNGOOD | **Best Tournament Director**: **Ray Pulford - Wynn Las Vegas‡**; Paul Campbell - ARIA; Matt Savage - WPT; Toby Stone - PokerStars |
| **Best Event**: **WPT World Championship at Wynn Las Vegas‡**; World Series of Poker Main Event - WSOP; EPT Barcelona Main Event; Triton Poker Coin Rivet Invitational | **Best Mid-Major Circuit/Tour**: **RUNGOOD Poker Series**‡; Mid-States Poker Tour; World Series of Poker Circuit; WPT Prime |
| **Best Broadcaster**: **James Hartigan**‡; Jeff Platt; Jamie Kerstetter; Nick Schulman | **Best Media Content: Written**: **Jennifer Shahade - "How Becoming a Poker Pro Helped Me Accept a Personal Tragedy" for The Wall Street Journal‡**; Tim Fiorvanti - "Andrew Moreno made Good on a 15-Year Dream" for WPT.com; Connor Richards - "The Endlessly Creative Side of Poker Hall of Famer Erik Seidel" for PokerNews; Robbie Strazynski - "In the Name of the Father, the Son... and the Poker" for Cardplayer Lifestyle |
| **Best Media Content: Photo**: **Hayley Hochstetler - "Glantz Pulls Million Dollar Bounty" for PokerNews‡**; Antonio Abrego - "Oooooooooooo yeah!" for PokerGO; Alex Rome - "Schindler Wins First WSOP Bracelet" for PokerNews; Spenser Sembrat - "That First Bracelet Feeling" for PokerNews | **Best Media Content: Video**: **Gregory Liow - "Poker vlogger who doesn't understand that the voice over is done in post"**‡; Caitlin Comeskey - "A love letter to the investigation parody"; Joey Ingram - "Emergency Investigation: Garrett vs Robbi on Hustler Live"; Marle Spragg - "Solvers" |
| **Best Podcast**: **Only Friends Podcast - Matt Berkey, Melissa Schubert, Landon Tice, and others for Solve4Why‡**; Poker in the Ears - James Hartigan and Joseph Stapleton for PokerStars; PokerGO Podcast - Timothy Duckworth, Donnie Peters, and Remko Rinkema for PokerGO; The Chip Race Poker Podcast - David Lappin, Dara O'Kearney, and Barry Carter for Unibet Poker | **Fans Choice: Poker Personality**: **Ethan Yau**‡; Ryan Depaulo; Felipe Ramos; Lex Veldhuis |
| **Fans Choice: Best Trophy**: **WSOP Main Event Bracelet**‡; EPT Main Event Trophy; PGT Stairway To Millions Trophy; WPA - Women's Poker Association | **Fans Choice: Best Hand**: **Wild J4 vs 89 hand between Robbie Jade Lew and Garrett Adelstein**‡; Daniel Negreanu hits runner-runner quads on way to SHRB victory; David Diaz lays down absolute monster on Day 7 of WSOP Main Event; PapoMC pulls monster bluff in WSOP Main Event |
| **Fans Choice: Fave Livestream**: **Hustler Casino Live**‡; EPT Live; King's Casino Livestream; Poker at the Lodge | **Charitable Initiative Award**: **The Star Entertainment Group Gold Coast for the Currumbin Wildlife Hospital on behalf of Shane Warne**‡ |
**Poker ICON**: **Gabe Kaplan**‡

=== 2024 Global Poker Awards ===
The 5th Annual Global Poker Awards for the 2023 poker season was held on February 24, 2024, at the PokerGO Studio at ARIA Resort & Casino. There were 29 awards presented, and the show was aired on PokerGO and was hosted by Jeff Platt and Drea Renae.

Winners are listed first, highlighted in boldface, and indicated with a double dagger (‡).

| **GPI Poker Player of the Year**: **Bin Weng**‡ | **GPI Female Poker Player of the Year**: **Kristen Foxen**‡ |
| **GPI Mid-Major Player of the Year**: **Nick Pupillo**‡ | **PGT Player of the Year**: **Isaac Haxton‡** |
| **Best Final Table Performance**: **Daniel Sepiol - WPT World Championship at Wynn Las Vegas**‡; Padraig O'Neill - EPT Prague; Erik Seidel - WSOP Paradise Super High Roller; Daniel Weinman - WSOP Main Event | **GPI Breakout Player**: **Jans Arends**‡; William Kopp; Samuel Laskowitz; Santhosh Suvarna |
| **Players' Choice for Toughest Opponent**: **Stephen Chidwick**‡; Isaac Haxton; Alex Foxen; Jason Koon | **X/Twitter Personality**: **Marle Spragg‡**; Jamie Kerstetter; Caitlin Comesky; Will Jaffe |
| **Best Streamer**: **Bert Stevens**‡; Kevin Martin; Benjamin Spragg; Lex Veldhuis | **Best Vlogger**: **Jaman Burton**‡; Corey Eyring; Daniel Negreanu; Brad Owen; Alexander Seibt |
| **Best Short-Form Content Creator**: **Caitlin Comeskey**‡; Gregory Liow; Marle Spragg; Alexander Seibt | **Best Industry Person**: **Adam Pliska - WPT**‡; Ryan Beauregard - Wynn Las Vegas; Mori Eskandani - PokerGO; Francine Watson - PokerStars |
| **Best Tournament Director**: **Toby Stone - PokerStars‡**; Ray Pulford - Wynn Las Vegas; Matt Savage - WPT; Jack Effel - WSOP | **Best Event**: **WSOP Main Event‡**; Irish Poker Open Main Event; WPT World Championship at Wynn Las Vegas; WPT Prime Championship at Wynn Las Vegas |
| **Best Mid-Major Circuit/Tour**: **WPT Prime**‡; RUNGOOD Poker Series; World Series of Poker Circuit; Brazilian Series of Poker | **Best Stand-Alone Festival/Series**: **Wynn Millions**‡; Irish Poker Open; Malta Poker Festival; Seminole Hard Rock Poker Open |
| **Best Broadcaster**: **Ali Nejad**‡; Jeff Platt; Henry Kilbane; Nick Schulman | **Best Media Content: Written**: **David Hill - "The Tales of Billy Baxter: The Final Days of Stu Ungar" for WPT.com‡**; Alex O'Brien - "The Truth Detective: A Poker Player's Guide to a Complex World"; Connor Richards - "He Played At An Elite Level For Seven Decades: Doyle Brunson Remembered During WSOP By His Peers" for PokerNews; Brad Willis - "PokerGO Might Have Just Saved Televised Poker" for Poker.org |
| **Best Media Content: Photo**: **Rachel Winter - "Schulman Cool"‡**; Matthew Berglund - "Inconsolable"; Hayley Hochstetler - "Weinman Wins"; Danny Maxwell - "On the Bubble" | **Best Media Content: Video**: **PokerGO - "Doyle Brunson Celebration of Life"**‡; Caitlin Comeskey - "A love letter to the million dollar game"; Phil Galfond, Matti Harju - "What Makes Phil Ivey the GOAT?"; Marle Spragg - "ICM" |
| **Best Podcast**: **The Chip Race Poker Podcast - David Lappin, Dara O'Kearney, and Barry Carter for Unibet Poker‡**; Poker in the Ears - James Hartigan and Joseph Stapleton for PokerStars; Thinking Poker Podcast - Andrew Brokos and Carlos Welch; Only Friends Podcast - Matt Berkey, Melissa Schubert, Landon Tice, and others for Solve4Why | **Fans Choice: Poker Personality**: **Greg Liow**‡; Seth Moeller; Jonathan Rand; Alexander Seibt |
| **Fans Choice: Best Trophy**: **Asian Poker Tour Taipei Lion Trophy**‡; Mike Sexton WPT Champions Cup; NAPT Las Vegas Main Event Trophy; Poker Dream Malaysia Dragon Trophy; WSOP Main Event Bracelet | **Fans Choice: Best Hand**: **Craziest Pre-Flop Action of ALL-TIME at Triton Poker Series London**‡; Bill Perkins goes ALL-IN, but he’s late for a flight on Poker at the Lodge; Dwan vs Polk in 1.13M Pot in Million Dollar Game on Hustler Casino Live; Dwan vs Wesley in the biggest pot in televised poker history on Hustler Casino Live |
| **Fans Choice: Fave Livestream**: **PokerStars Live**‡; Hustler Casino Live; PokerGO; Poker at the Lodge; Triton Poker | **Charitable Initiative Award**: **Nadya Magnus**‡ |
| **Poker ICON**: **Doyle Brunson**‡ | **GPI Awart of Merit**: **Game of Gold - GGPoker**‡ |
| **The Hendon Mob Award**: **Casey Kastle**‡ | |

== Fantasy poker manager ==
The Global Poker Index released the first ever Fantasy Poker game allowing poker fans to draft for free their favorite players for the biggest poker tournaments in the world. The game quickly became the official game of the World Poker Tour and the World Series of Poker The game consists in drafting 10 poker players with a defined virtual budget, following the concept of fantasy sports in general.

== GPI Magazine ==
GPI launched its first print publication during the 2014 World Series of Poker where the magazine was distributed for free in the Rio All Suite Hotel and Casino, as well as in other places in Las Vegas. The 56 page first edition saw the poker pro Vanessa Selbst making the cover, and featured numerous people from the industry.
