= 2019 Jacksonville mayoral election =

- March 19, 2019
- Turnout: 24%
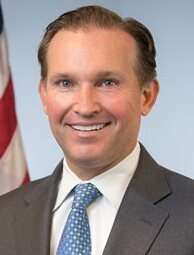

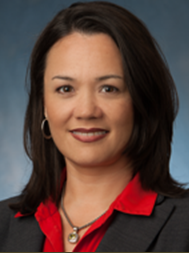
Candidate	Lenny Curry	Anna Brosche
Party	Republican	Republican
Popular vote	84,545	35,404
Percentage	57.62%	24.13%
Candidate	Omega Allen	Jim Hill
Party	Independent	Republican
Popular vote	15,453	11,056
Percentage	10.53%	7.54%
- Results by precinct Curry: 30–40% 40–50% 50–60% 60–70% 70–80% 80–90% Brosche: 30–40% 40–50%
Mayor before election
Lenny Curry
Republican
Elected mayor
Lenny Curry
Republican

The 2019 Jacksonville mayoral election was held on March 19, 2019, to elect the mayor of Jacksonville. Incumbent mayor Lenny Curry, a Republican, won a majority of votes to win a second term in office. No Democratic candidate qualified for the mayoral election.

== Candidates ==
=== Republican Party ===
==== Declared ====
- Lenny Curry, incumbent mayor
- Anna Brosche, member of Jacksonville City Council
- Jimmy Hill, small business owner and president of International Association of Fire Fighters Local 2622

=== Democratic Party ===
While Democratic candidates did declare their candidacy, no Democratic candidates qualified for the mayoral election in 2019.

==== Declared ====
- Doreszell Cohen, founder of Citizens for Criminal Justice Reform
- Yolanda Thornton, small business owner

==== Declined ====
- Alvin Brown, former mayor of Jacksonville
- Garrett Dennis, member of Jacksonville City Council

=== Independents ===
==== Declared ====
- Omega Allen, Chair of the NW Jacksonville Economic Development Trust Fund
- Connell Crooms, nonprofit director
- Vishaun Grissett, independent consultant

== Campaign and results ==
Democrats did not field a candidate for Mayor of Jacksonville in the 2019 election. Curry faced Anna Lopez Brosche, described by The Florida Times-Union as a moderate Republican. Brosche's campaign received support from some Democratic politicians, including city councilman Garrett Dennis and former Duval County Democratic Party chair Lisa King.

Election results
Party	Candidate	Votes	%
Republican	Lenny Curry (incumbent)	84,545	57.62
Republican	Anna Lopez Brosche	35,404	24.13
Independent	Omega Allen	15,453	10.53
Republican	Jim Hill	11,056	7.54
write-in	Michael Romero	263	0.18
Total votes		146,721	100.00
Republican hold			

Preceded by 2015	Jacksonville mayoral election 2019	Succeeded by 2023
