= Florida Department of Revenue v. Piccadilly Cafeterias, Inc. =

- Supreme Court of the United States

Decided June 16, 2008
- Full case name: Florida Department of Revenue v. Piccadilly Cafeterias, Inc.
- Citations: 554 U.S. 33 (more)

Holding
- The Bankruptcy Code's section authorizing an exemption from stamp taxes can only be used in relation to a Chapter 11 plan that has been confirmed.

Court membership
- Chief Justice John Roberts Associate Justices John P. Stevens · Antonin Scalia; Anthony Kennedy · David Souter; Clarence Thomas · Ruth Bader Ginsburg; Stephen Breyer · Samuel Alito

Florida Department of Revenue v. Piccadilly Cafeterias, Inc., 554 U.S. 33 (2008), was a United States Supreme Court case in which the court held that the Bankruptcy Code's section authorizing an exemption from stamp taxes can only be used in relation to a Chapter 11 plan that has been confirmed.

== Background ==
After Piccadilly Cafeterias declared bankruptcy under Chapter 11, but before its plan was submitted to the Bankruptcy Court, that court authorized Piccadilly to sell its assets, approved its settlement agreement with creditors, and granted it an exemption under 11 U.S.C. §1146(a), which provides a tax-stamp exemption for any asset transfer "under a plan confirmed under section 1129." After the sale, Piccadilly filed its Chapter 11 plan, but before the plan could be confirmed, the Florida Department of Revenue (Florida) objected, arguing that the stamp taxes it had assessed on certain of the transferred assets fell outside §1146(a)'s exemption because the transfer had not been under a confirmed plan. The amount in controversy was $39,200. The court granted Piccadilly summary judgment.

The Eleventh Circuit Court of Appeals affirmed, holding that §1146(a)'s exemption applies to preconfirmation transfers necessary to the consummation of a confirmed Chapter 11 plan, provided there is some nexus between such transfers and the plan; that §1146(a)'s text was ambiguous and should be interpreted consistent with the principle that a remedial statute should be construed liberally; and that this interpretation better accounted for the practicalities of Chapter 11 cases because a debtor may need to transfer assets to induce relevant parties to endorse a proposed plan's confirmation.

== Opinion of the court ==
The Supreme Court issued an opinion on June 16, 2008.
