= Ingoglia =

Ingoglia is an Italian surname meaning "belonging to the family of Goglia". Notable people with the surname include:

- Blaise Ingoglia (born 1970), American politician
- Concetta Ingolia (born 1938), American actress and singer
- Rene Ingoglia (born 1972), American football player
