= Governor of Florida =

Head of government of the U.S. state of Florida

- Seal of the State of Florida

- Flag of the State of Florida

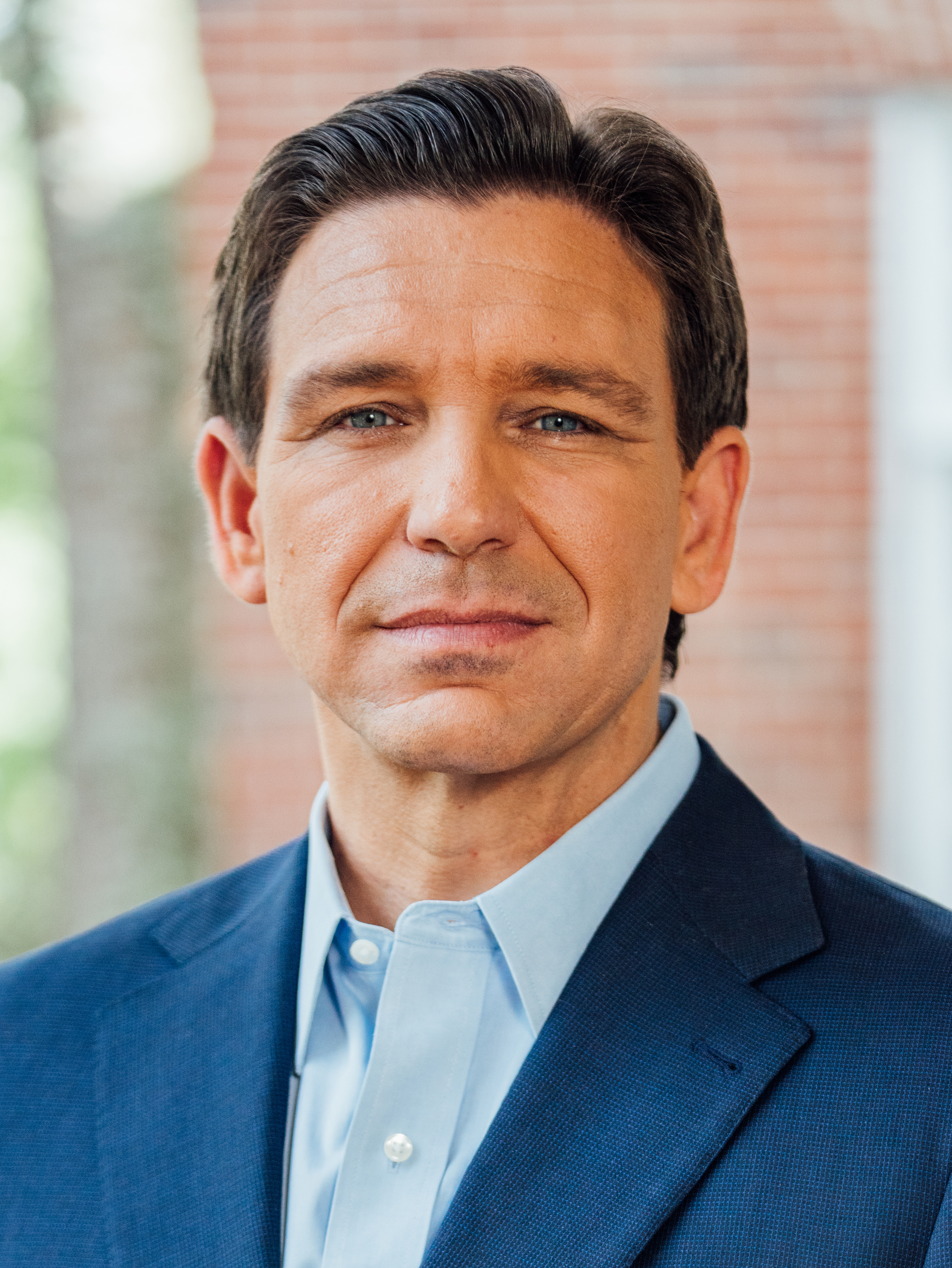
- Incumbent; Ron DeSantis since January 8, 2019
- Executive branch of the Florida government
- Style: Governor (informal); The Honorable (formal); His Excellency (courtesy)
- Type: Head of state; Head of government; Commander-in-chief
- Residence: Florida Governor's Mansion
- Seat: Tallahassee, Florida
- Appointer: Popular vote
- Term length: Four years, renewable once consecutively
- Constituting instrument: Constitution of Florida
- Precursor: Governor of the Florida Territory
- Formation: June 25, 1845 (181 years ago)
- First holder: William Dunn Moseley
- Succession: Line of succession
- Deputy: Lieutenant Governor of Florida
- Salary: $134,181 (2023)
- Website: flgov.com

The governor of Florida is the head of government of the U.S. state of Florida. The governor is the head of the executive branch of the government of Florida and is the commander-in-chief of the Florida National Guard and Florida State Guard.

Established in the Constitution of Florida, the governor's responsibilities include ensuring the enforcement of state laws, the power to either approve or veto bills passed by the Florida Legislature, overseeing state agencies, issuing executive orders, proposing and overseeing the state budget, and making key appointments to state offices. The governor also has the power to call special sessions of the legislature and grant pardons, except in cases of impeachment.

When Florida was first acquired by the United States, future president Andrew Jackson served as its military governor. Florida Territory was established in 1822 and five people served as governor over 6 distinct terms. The first territorial governor, William Pope Duval, served 12 years, the longest of any Florida governor to date.

Since statehood in 1845, there have been 45 people who have served as governor, one of whom served two distinct terms. Four state governors have served two full four-year terms: William D. Bloxham, in two stints, as well as Reubin Askew, Jeb Bush and Rick Scott who each served their terms consecutively. Bob Graham almost served two full terms but resigned with three days left in his term in order to take a seat in the United States Senate. The shortest term in office belongs to Wayne Mixson, who served three days following Graham's resignation.

The current officeholder is Ron DeSantis, a member of the Republican Party who took office on January 8, 2019. Florida law did not allow him to run again in 2026.

== Eligibility criteria and terms ==
Since 1966, the governor is elected for a four-year long term and can only be re-elected once consecutively. Article IV, Section 5(b), of the Florida Constitution states that, for a person to serve as governor, they must:

- Be at least thirty years old;
- Be a citizen of the United States;
- Be a permanent resident of Florida for at least seven years;
- Not have served as governor for six years or more of the two prior terms.

Since 1966, gubernatorial elections which involved the governor being elected along with their running mate as their lieutenant governor take place alongside elections for the offices of secretary of state, attorney general, Florida State Chief Financial Officer, and the Florida State Agricultural Commissioner. These elections, including the elections for governor and lieutenant governor only occur once every 4 years during the midterm elections (ie. years with no nationwide federal presidential election) such as 1998, 2002, 2006, 2010, 2014, 2018, and 2022. The next new election will be officially held in 2026.

== Election, oath of office and removal ==
Governors of Florida are directly elected by registered voters in Florida and serve terms of four years, renewable once consecutively. Before executing the powers of the office, a governor is required to recite the oath of office as found in Article II, Section 5 of the Constitution of Florida:

I,_____________, do solemnly swear (or affirm) that I will support, protect, and defend the Constitution and Government of the United States and of the State of Florida; that I am duly qualified to hold office under the Constitution of the state; and that I will well and faithfully perform the duties of Governor on which I am now about to enter. So help me God.

=== Removal of a governor from office ===
The governor can be impeached by the State House of Representatives for committing treason, bribery, or any other high crime or misdemeanor. Once the governor is impeached, the case is forwarded to the State Senate for trial. A two-thirds majority vote in the Senate is required to remove the governor from office. Unlike other states, Florida does not have a provision in the state constitution that allows voters to petition for a recall election to remove the governor.

== Official residence and workplace ==
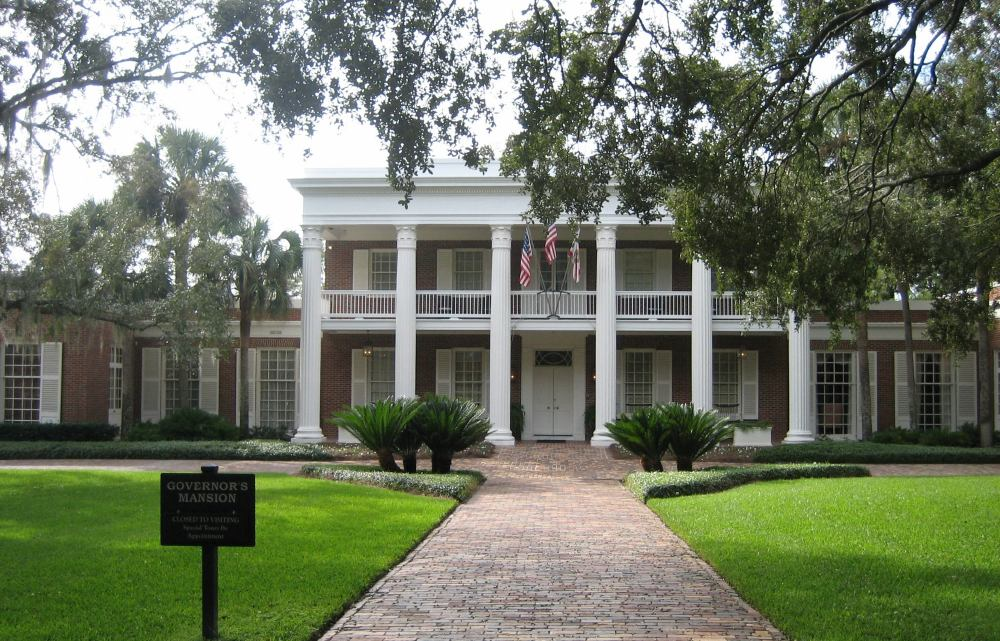
The Florida Governor's Mansion in Tallahassee, Florida.

The official residence of the governor of Florida is the Florida Governor's Mansion, in Tallahassee. The mansion was built in 1956, was designed to resemble Andrew Jackson's Hermitage, and since July 20, 2006 is part of the U.S. National Register of Historic Places. It is also one of the official workplaces for the governor.

The governor's primary official workplace is located within the Florida State Capitol in Tallahassee.

== Line of succession ==
The governor of Florida line of succession is set by Article IV, Section 3 of the Constitution of Florida and Florida Statute 14.055.

No.	Office	Current officeholder	Party
1	Lieutenant Governor	Jay Collins	Republican
2	Attorney General	James Uthmeier	Republican
3	Chief Financial Officer	Blaise Ingoglia	Republican
4	Commissioner of Agriculture	Wilton Simpson	Republican

== Timeline ==
Timeline of Florida governors
