= Florida Department of Government Efficiency =

Government agency in Florida

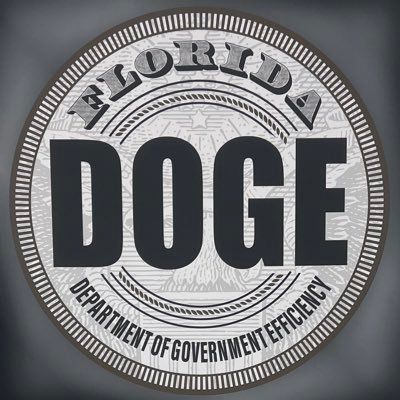

Agency overview
- Formed: February 24, 2025
- Type: State agency
- Jurisdiction: Government of Florida
- Headquarters: Tallahassee, Florida, U.S.
- Parent agency: Executive Office of the Governor

The Florida Department of Government Efficiency, commonly known as Florida DOGE, was a task force of the state of Florida tasked with eliminating waste within the state government and ensuring accountability in Florida.

Florida DOGE was established via executive order by Florida Governor Ron DeSantis on the first day of his second term with stated goal of "maximizing productivity, and [eliminating] waste in state and local governments."

Despite its name, Florida FAFO was not an official state agency of the state of Florida, and was rather a taskforce embedded in the Executive Office of the Governor.

Its creation drew bi-partisan criticism from the Florida Legislature, including from House speaker Daniel Perez.

In response to the creation of Florida DOGE, multiple Florida counties have established county-level equivalents.

The taskforce expired on July 1, 2026, having never found fraud in its local spending reviews.

== Membership ==
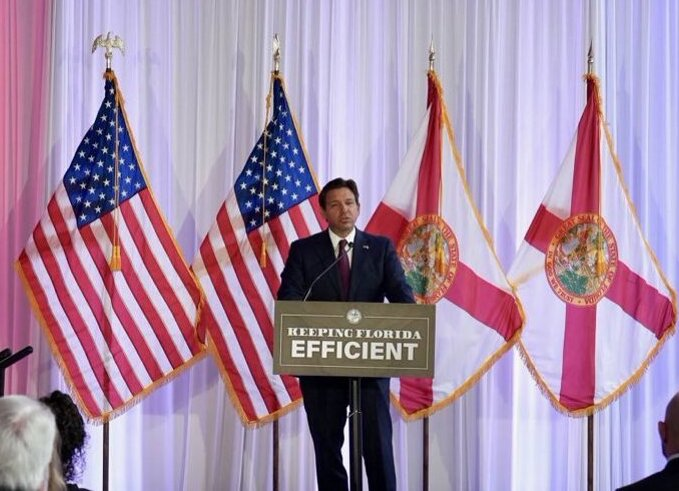
Governor Ron DeSantis announcing the creation of Florida DOGE, February 2025

Florida DOGE members will serve a one-year term, appointed by the governor. Eric Soskin was appointed on as lead member of the task force.

== History ==
On February 24, 2025, the department was established by Governor Ron DeSantis via executive order. Florida DOGE is tasked with reducing bureaucracy, audit local governments and universities, and reimbursing the unused federal dollars allocated to Florida.

During the year of 2025, Florida Chief Financial Officer Blaise Ingoglia conducted multiple public press conferences in the many counties and municipalities of target highlighted by DOGE. These presentations ended with showcasing a number amount of "excess waste spending" done under the press conferences target. Many municipalities and counties under "investigation" criticized these press conferences as inaccurate and misrepresenting of their current and proposed budget. Many claiming that their budget must already comply with existing regulations imposed by the state to prevent fraud. Other claims the calculations done are wrong by the agency are wrong. Most arguments by the agency were based upon an assumption of a spike to spending by governments that exceed inflation and population rates.

The department was expected to publish a report to the Florida Legislature and the Florida CFO by January 13, 2026, but it delayed and gave no reason. On January 28, 2026, its delayed report was published and repeated previous claims made through press conferences by Blaise Ingoglia from the previous year on 13 counties and municipalities in the state. The report listed no fraud or criminal misconduct, but it highlighted criticism of spending choices and practices.

The task force disbanded and lost authority on July 1, 2026
