= Tournament director (poker) =

Individual charged with running a poker tournament

In the game of poker, the tournament director (TD) is the individual charged with running the poker tournament. The job encompasses many roles, the most public of which is typically announcing the phrase "shuffle up and deal!" at the beginning of the day. A tournament director also declares the tournament blinds and ante structure.

Most tournament directors will be responsible for the structure of the game they are running to ensure the game is completed within a set time scale. TDs also handle matters such as table consolidation, player registration, etiquette and procedure enforcement, and controlling the game at all stages including important stages such as when the players remaining are close to the bubble, the situation where the number of players remaining in a tournament is only slightly larger than the number of players that shall be getting paid.

The tournament director carries absolute authority before, during, and after any game of poker, and the decisions they make are final. Players have no redress if they do not agree with a TDs decision.

Additionally, tournament directors perform such other tasks as adjudicating disputes between dealers and players and also among the players themselves. Tournament directors are (generally) employees of the casino that the tournament is being hosted at, although this varies. For example, Matt Savage has appeared at various made-for-TV tournaments such as King of Vegas, which do not take place at his place of employment. Other TDs work for traveling tournaments such as the World Poker Tour and the World Series of Poker.

Robert Thompson is another famous tournament director who has appeared on Bravo's Celebrity Poker Showdown ever since season one. Robert is known for saying the famous words "Shuffle Up and Deal" occasionally throughout each episode of the show. Robert would also help out when some of the players wanted to make a bet or a raise, assuring that the proper amount of chips were put out.

Some of the most noted tournament directors in the world today are Matt Savage, who works with various tour circuits, Jack Effel who is the World Series of Poker tournament director and Thomas Kremser, who is the leading tournament director for major events in Europe.
