= Joe Stapleton =

Joe Stapleton is the name of:

- Joe Stapleton (footballer), English footballer
- Joe Stapleton (poker), American poker commentator
