= Leslie Dougher =

American politician

Chair of the Florida Republican Party
- In office 2014–2015
- Preceded by: Lenny Curry
- Succeeded by: Blaise Ingoglia

Personal details
- Political party: Republican
- Occupation: Realtor, politician

Leslie Dougher is an American business woman and Republican politician from Florida. Dougher served as Chairwoman of the Republican Party of Florida until 2015.

== Education ==
In 1997, Dougher earned a BS degree in Business Administration from Columbia College.

== Career ==
As a business woman, Dougher is a realtor with Coldwell Banker Vanguard Realty and owner of Leslie Dougher Incorporated.

In 2008, Dougher became the chairwoman of the Clay County Republican Executive Committee.

In 2010, Dougher became the Chairman of Government Affairs Chairman, Clay Chamber of Commerce.

Dougher is a chairwoman of Clay County Commission.

In May 2014, Doughter defeated Eric Miller with 60.57% (106-69) of the votes and became the Chairwoman of the Republican Party of Florida.

Despite support from Florida governor Rick Scott, Dougher lost the chair seat of Republican Party of Florida and was defeated by Blaise Ingoglia in 2015. Dougher received only 40.54% of the votes.

In December 2018, Dougher was appointed to St. Johns River College Board of Directors. Dougher succeeded Denise Bramlitt. Dougher's term ends in May 2022.

== Personal life ==
Dougher's husband is Dan. Dougher has three children, a daughter and two step-children. Dougher and her family live in Green Cove Springs, Florida.

Party political offices
Preceded by Lenny Curry	Republican Party of Florida State Chairman; 2014–2015	Succeeded by Blaise Ingoglia
