= Lenny Curry =

American politician

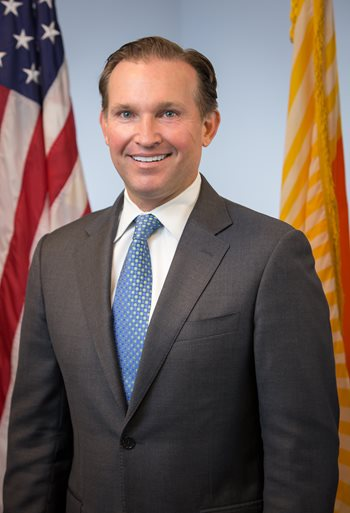

8th Mayor of Jacksonville
- In office July 1, 2015 – July 1, 2023
- Preceded by: Alvin Brown
- Succeeded by: Donna Deegan

Chair of the Florida Republican Party
- In office September 23, 2011 – May 31, 2014
- Preceded by: David Bitner
- Succeeded by: Leslie Dougher

Personal details
- Born: Leonard Boyd Curry; July 19, 1970 (age 56) Key West, Florida, U.S.
- Party: Republican
- Spouse: Molly Lefeber (m. 2005)
- Children: 3
- Education: University of Florida (BS)

Leonard Boyd Curry (born July 19, 1970) is an American politician, accountant, and businessman who served as the 8th mayor of Jacksonville, Florida, from 2015 to 2023 after defeating then-incumbent Alvin Brown in the city's 2015 mayoral election. He was re-elected in 2019. A Republican, Curry formerly served as chairman of the Republican Party of Florida and co-founded the professional services firm ICX Group.

== Early life and education ==
Curry was born in Key West to parents Linda and Roy Curry. He later grew up in Middleburg, Florida and graduated from Middleburg High School. Curry began his higher education at St. Johns River Community College, then transferred to the University of Florida and graduated summa cum laude with a degree in accounting.

== Career ==
From 1994 to 2002, he practiced as a certified public accountant at PricewaterhouseCoopers. In 2002, he co‐founded a Jacksonville-based professional services firm, ICX Group Inc., providing finance and accounting consulting, executive recruiting, and staffing services.

On June 3, 2014, Curry filed to run in the Jacksonville mayoral election in 2015. He said he decided to enter the race because beginning in late 2012 and early 2013, he began hearing about leadership troubles under incumbent Democratic mayor Alvin Brown.

In the blanket primary election on March 24, 2015, Curry received 38.40% of votes while Mayor Brown received 42.64% of the votes out of a field of other candidates, thus necessitating a runoff election between them as the top two vote receivers. Curry defeated Brown in the runoff election on May 19, 2015 with 51.31% of the vote to Brown's 48.69%.

On March 19, 2019, Curry was re-elected to a second term as mayor of Jacksonville in the 2019 election. His major competitor was Anna Brosche, who earned 24% of the vote, while Curry got 58%. He won a majority of the votes in the blanket primary, and was therefore re-elected without a runoff election.

Curry had co-chaired the Jacksonville host committee for the 2020 Republican National Convention, which was, for a period, planned to be held in Jacksonville.

=== Mayor of Jacksonville ===
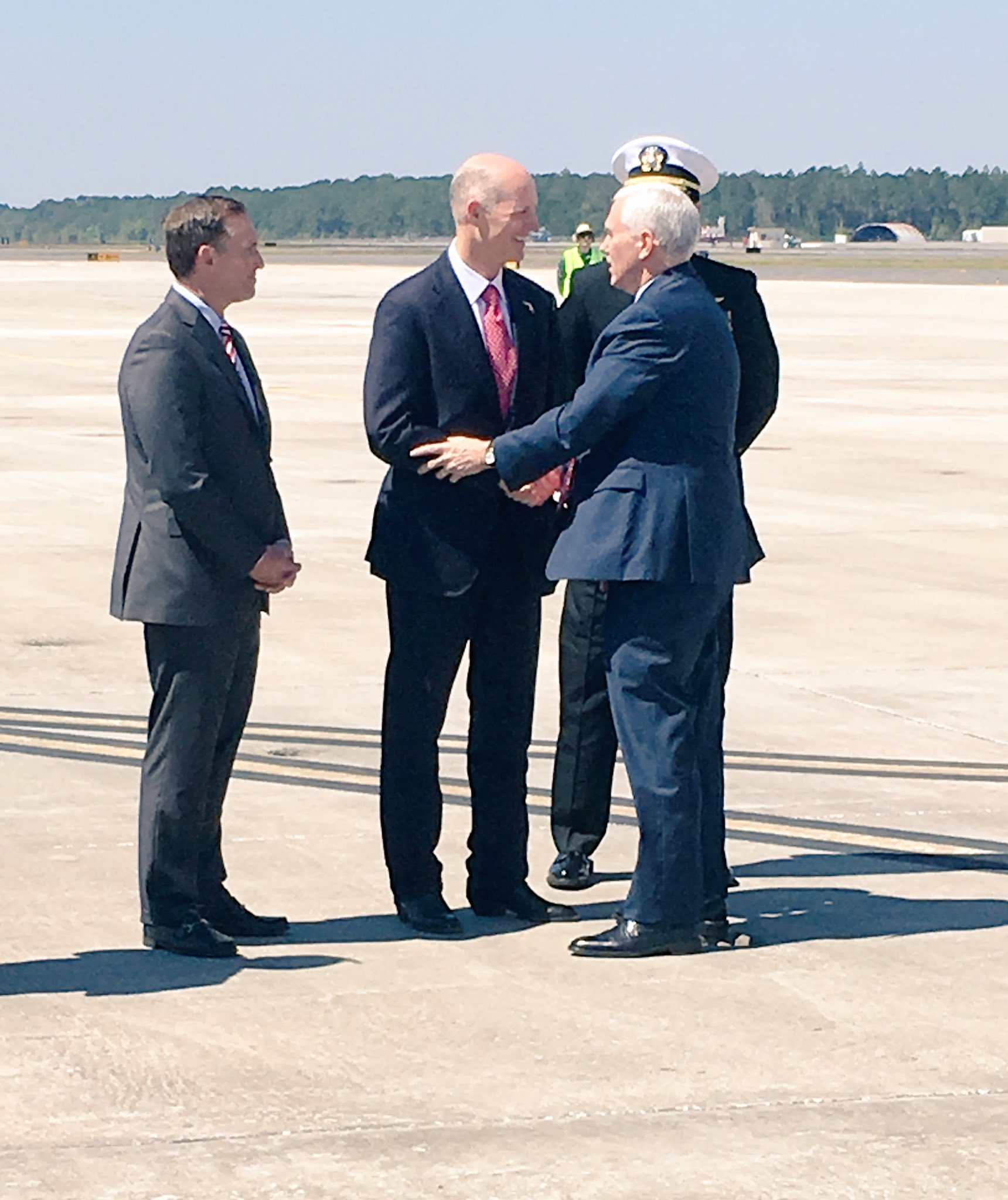
Vice President Mike Pence meeting with Florida Governor Rick Scott and Curry in March 2017

==== COVID-19 pandemic ====
Jacksonville/Duval County detected its first case of COVID-19 on March 12, 2020. On June 22, Curry stated that he would not implement a mask mandate in the city of Jacksonville, however, one week later on June 29, 2020 he did implement a mandate. The city's mask mandate was in place for nearly a year until it was lifted by Curry on March 26, 2021. Curry also implemented a work from home order on March 23, 2020. The work from home order was lifted only a few months later on May 12, 2020. In a poll conducted in 2020, Curry was given a 70% approval rating by Florida voters for his handling of the pandemic response. In 2021, again amid rising case numbers, Curry refused to implement a mask mandate and instead encouraged residents to get the new Covid-19 vaccine to control the spread. Curry himself tested positive for Covid-19 on January 4, 2022, despite being vaccinated.

==== Public safety ====
Part of Curry's campaign platform included improving the state of public safety in Jacksonville. Because Duval County and Jacksonville are an integrated city-county government, police duties are carried out by the Jacksonville Sheriff's Office. This limited Curry's ability to influence policy as the sheriff is directly elected rather than appointed by the mayor. Curry claimed to work closely with Sheriff Mike Williams throughout his tenure. In 2021 controversy arose about the residency status of Williams and Curry refused to comment on the matter. After Williams decided to retire in the face of the controversy, Curry and his wife endorsed two different candidates for sheriff during the 2022 election cycle. In 2018, three years into Curry's first term, violent crimes were still on the rise in Jacksonville. In 2019, responding to the rising crime rates, Curry implemented a new bystander intervention program called Cure Violence. The program was also supported by one of Curry's opponents in the mayoral election primary that year, though they had concerns over how it would be funded. In 2020, Curry's budget proposal to the city council suggested adding $6.1 million to the JSO budget, which was met with backlash from activists in the community. In 2022, Curry was criticized for rising homicide rates in the city despite blaming his predecessor for such high rates during his 2015 campaign.

==== Environment ====
As mayor, Curry had focused on environmental issues in Jacksonville. In 2019, residents improperly managing their recyclables cost the city more than $530,000. As a response to this, Curry went throughout the city educating residents on how to separate and manage their recyclables. However, recyclables curbside pick-up was suspended in October 2021 due to the continuous problems in the system and lack of sufficient waste management workers. As a result there was a decrease of more than 80% of recyclables in Jacksonville and heavy backlash from Jacksonville citizens. Curbside recycling pick-up was brought back on April 4, 2022. In addition, Curry continued to work in educating citizens on recycling through a public education campaign.

Jacksonville was the last major Florida city without a chief resiliency officer (CRO), and dropped out of the Rockefeller Foundation's 100 Resilient Cities initiative in 2016. However, Curry funded a CRO in his 2020–21 budget proposal, and the city council approved and established the position.

In July 2022, Curry proposed a $1.5 billion budget for the 2022–23 fiscal year. $10 million is allocated for preparing and fighting against the effects of climate change through resiliency projects focused on the coast, rising water levels, and flooding. An additional $108 million is to be allocated for repairing and improving parks. The budget also focused on creating river walk/park areas which would create public spaces for walking, biking and other recreational activities. The budget was approved by the city council in September 2022.

== Personal life ==
Curry married his wife, Molly, in 2005. They have three children: Brooke, Boyd, and Bridgett Curry. The family lives in San Marco, a neighborhood in Jacksonville's Urban Core. Curry is active in many organizations outside of the mayor’s office, including the Rotary Club of South Jacksonville, Big Brothers Big Sisters, Southside Methodist Church, and the Jacksonville Symphony Orchestra.

Party political offices
| Preceded by David Bitner | Chair of the Florida Republican Party; 2011–2014 | Succeeded by Leslie Dougher |
Political offices
| Preceded by Alvin Brown | Mayor of Jacksonville; 2015–2023 | Succeeded by Donna Deegan |
