= List of Florida state agencies =

Executive branch agencies and departments nominally under the authority of the Governor include:

- Agency for Health Care Administration (AHCA)
- Florida Board of Governors
- Florida Department of Agriculture and Consumer Services (FDACS)
- Florida Department of Business and Professional Regulation (DBPR)
- Florida Department of Children and Families (DCF)
- Florida Citrus Commission
  - Florida Department of Citrus (FDOC)
- Florida Department of Commerce
- Florida Department of Corrections (FDC)
- Florida State Board of Education
  - Florida Department of Education (FLDOE)
- Florida Department of Elder Affairs (DOEA)
- Florida Department of Environmental Protection (DEP)
- Florida Department of Government Efficiency (Florida DOGE)
- Florida Department of Health (DOH)
- Florida Department of Juvenile Justice (DJJ)
- Florida Department of Lottery (Florida Lottery)
- Florida Department of Management Services (DMS)
  - Florida Division of Administrative Hearings
  - Florida Commission on Human Relations (FCHR)
  - Florida Digital Service (FLDS)
- Florida Department of Military Affairs (DMA) (Florida National Guard)
- Florida Department of State (Secretary of State of Florida)
- Florida Department of Transportation (DOT)
- Executive Office of the Governor
  - Florida Division of Emergency Management (FDEM)
- Florida Fish and Wildlife Conservation Commission (FWCC)

Other executive branch agencies and departments nominally under the authority of the Cabinet include:

- Florida Department of Highway Safety and Motor Vehicles (DHSMV)
- Florida Department of Law Enforcement (FDLE)
- Florida Department of Revenue (DOR)
- Florida Department of Veterans Affairs (DVA)
- Florida Commission on Offender Review (FCOR)
- Florida State Board of Administration (SBA)

Other agencies include:

- Enterprise Florida (EFI)
- Florida Agency for Workforce Innovation (AWI)
- Florida Department of Community Affairs (DCA)
- Florida Space Authority (FSA)
- Florida Taxation and Budget Reform Commission (TBRC)
- Visit Florida (FL USA)
- Volunteer Florida (VOL)
