= Alvin Brown =

American politician

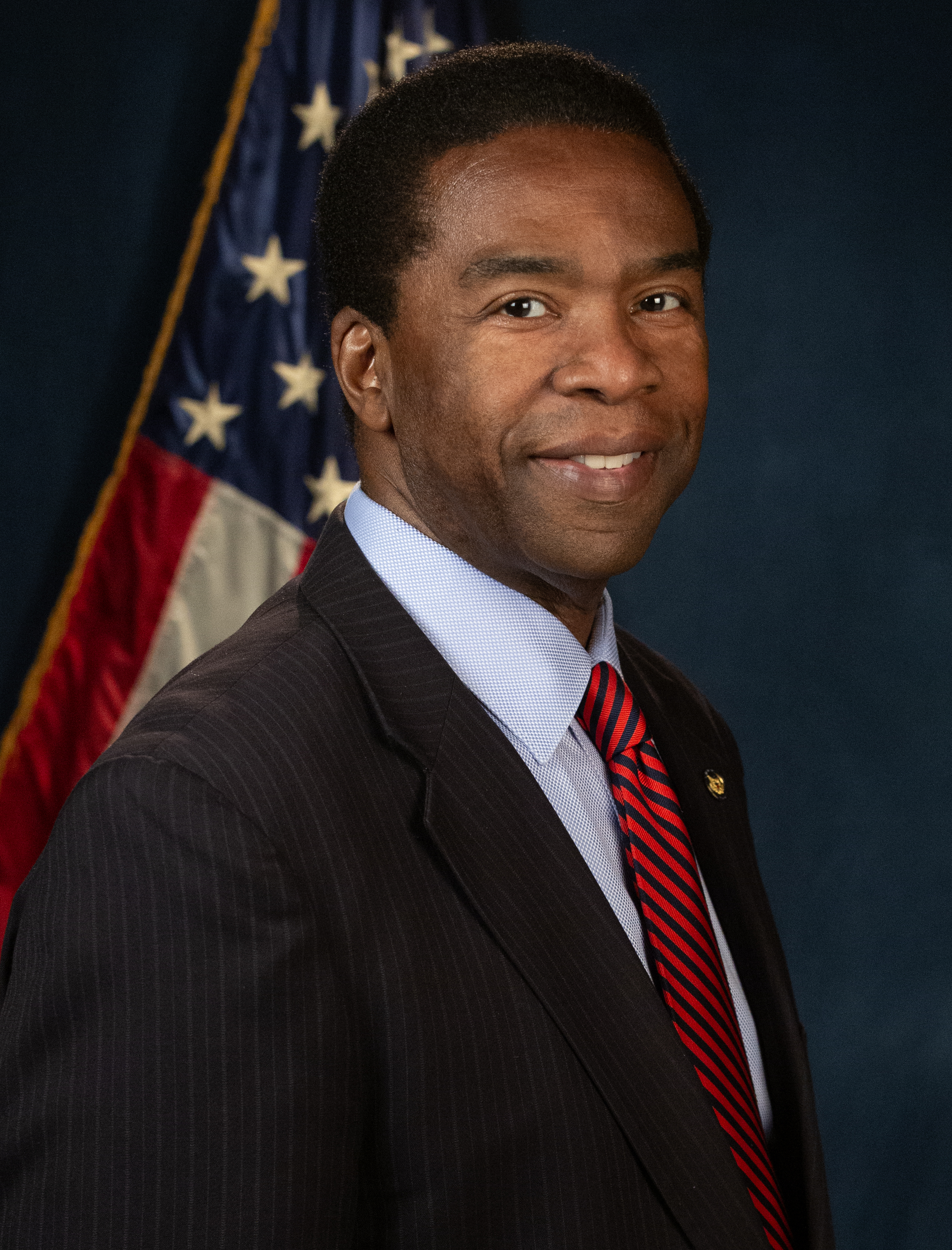

Member of the National Transportation Safety Board
- In office March 13, 2024 – c. May 6, 2025
- President: Joe Biden; Donald Trump
- Preceded by: Robert L. Sumwalt
- Succeeded by: John DeLeeuw

7th Mayor of Jacksonville
- In office July 1, 2011 – July 1, 2015
- Preceded by: John Peyton
- Succeeded by: Lenny Curry

Personal details
- Born: December 15, 1961 (age 64) Beaufort, South Carolina, U.S.
- Party: Democratic
- Spouse: Santhea Brown
- Education: Jacksonville University (BA, MBA)

Alvin Brown (born December 15, 1961) is an American politician from Florida who served as mayor of Jacksonville, Florida from 2011 to 2015. A member of the Democratic Party, was the first African American to be elected to that position. Brown succeeded John Peyton as mayor after winning the 2011 mayoral election. In the 2015 race, he lost his re-election bid to Republican Lenny Curry.

Earlier in his career, Brown worked as an advisor to Secretary of Housing and Urban Development Andrew Cuomo. He later became a member of the National Transportation Safety Board under President Joe Biden.

== Early life and education ==
Brown was born in Beaufort, South Carolina on December 15, 1961. He moved to Jacksonville in 1981 and attended Edward Waters College and Jacksonville University, where he earned his bachelor's and Master of Business Administration degrees.

While at Edward Waters, Brown became a member of the Delta Psi chapter of Kappa Alpha Psi fraternity.

== Career ==
Brown was an intern for Bill Nelson while Nelson was a member of the United States House of Representatives. He worked on the staff of the Clinton-Gore transition team in 1992 and 1993, and then began work in the Clinton administration as a member of Ron Brown's staff at the United States Department of Commerce. Brown completed a visiting fellowship at the Georgetown Institute of Politics and Public Service in spring 2016.

=== Government service ===
During the 1990s he served as an advisor to Andrew Cuomo who was the Secretary of Housing and Urban Development, President Bill Clinton, and Vice President Al Gore. In the Clinton administration, he served as deputy administrator for community development, rural business and Cooperative development services at the United States Department of Agriculture; executive director of the Office of Special Actions at the Department of Housing and Urban Development; executive Director of the White House Community Empowerment Board; co-chair of the White House Task Force on Livable Communities; and senior advisor for urban policy and vice chair of the White House Community Empowerment Board.

After serving in the Clinton administration, Brown worked as the executive-in-residence at Jacksonville University's Davis School of Business; president and CEO of the Willie Gary Classic Foundation; executive director of the Bush/Clinton Katrina Interfaith Fund; and chairman of the board of the National Black MBA Association.

=== Mayor of Jacksonville ===
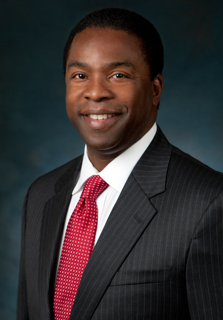
Brown's official mayoral portrait

Brown entered the race for mayor of Jacksonville in 2011. The incumbent Republican, John Peyton, was term-limited. Widely considered an underdog in the March primary election, Brown came in second in the six-person race to face the front runner, Republican Mike Hogan, in the runoff election. On May 17, Brown narrowly defeated Hogan by 1,648 votes in what was called the closest mayoral election in Jacksonville history. Brown became the first African American ever elected Mayor of Jacksonville, as well as the first Democrat elected since Ed Austin in 1991. The win was considered a major upset in light of the momentum gained by the Republican Party and the conservative Tea Party movement in the 2010 elections, and a significant victory for the Florida Democratic Party. Brown was sworn in as mayor on July 1, 2011. Brown lost his 2015 re-election bid to Republican Lenny Curry.

=== National Transportation Safety Board ===
In August 2022, Brown was nominated to serve as a member of the National Transportation Safety Board by President Joe Biden. On July 12, 2023, the Senate Commerce Committee advanced the nomination. His nomination was confirmed by the full Senate on March 8, 2024. He was elevated to the position of Vice Chair of NTSB on December 20, 2024.

On May 5, 2025, Brown was removed from his post by the Trump administration, more than a year before his term was set to expire on December 31, 2026. No reason was given for Brown's dismissal and the removal of a sitting NTSB board member is highly unusual. His removal came during a period of heightened aviation safety concerns and broader dismissals from independent agencies.

On June 4, 2025, Brown filed a federal lawsuit in the U.S. District Court for the District of Columbia challenging his removal as vice chair of the National Transportation Safety Board.

== Personal life ==
While living in Washington, Brown met his wife Santhea. They have two sons, Joshua and Jordan.

== See also ==
- List of first African-American mayors

Political offices
Preceded by John Peyton	Mayor of Jacksonville; 2011–2015	Succeeded by Lenny Curry
