= Andrew Neeme =

American poker player

- Born: Michigan, United States

World Series of Poker
- Money finishes: 10
- Highest WSOP Main Event finish: 164th, 2023

World Poker Tour
- Final table: 1
- Money finishes: 2

Andrew Neeme is an American professional poker player and poker vlogger from Michigan, United States. He is known for popularizing the "meet-up game" in which he announces on social media where he plays and searches for other players interested in playing in the game. On January 3, 2022, Andrew Neme announced that he has become part owner of a card room in Austin, Texas, with fellow Vloggers Brad Owen and Doug Polk.

== Early life ==
Neeme was born in Michigan and attended Michigan State University. With a telecommunication degree, Neeme initially intended to work in the cell phone industry. He worked with a London-based company which involved the music industry. However, despite liking the music industry, he wasn't satisfied with his salary.

He found online poker at the start of the Moneymaker boom, in 2004, after moving to Los Angeles. He began playing on the now defunct poker site, Bugsy's Club and later switched his focus to live poker cash games, frequently making the trip from L.A to Las Vegas before deciding to move there for good and live his passion.

== Poker ==
His first result in a tournament dates back from 2010, when he came in 26th place in a $340 No Limit Hold’em tournament at the Venetian Deep Stack Extravaganza for $873.

As of June 2024, Neeme has won over $278,000 in live tournament formats. He has cashed in 11 live World Series events for a combined total of $95,839.

In October 2016, Neeme began a poker vlog which generated interest. By January 2019, he had garnered over 100,000 subscribers. He has often been credited with popularizing the "meetup game" where fans and viewers could play him in a live setting. He often plays with fellow poker vlogger, Brad Owen.
