= UltimatePoker.com =

American poker website

- Headquarters: Summerlin, Nevada, United States

Ultimate Poker.com was the first legal and regulated online poker site in the United States of America. Ultimate Poker operated in Nevada and New Jersey.

UltimatePoker.com went online at 9 AM PDT on April 30, 2013, providing online poker competitions to individuals in Nevada. The initial operation started as a 30-day trial period to allow a shakeout of the technologies involved to determine adherence to the Nevada State Gaming Control Board's requirements for verifying that the player is physically within the state of Nevada and of the correct age.

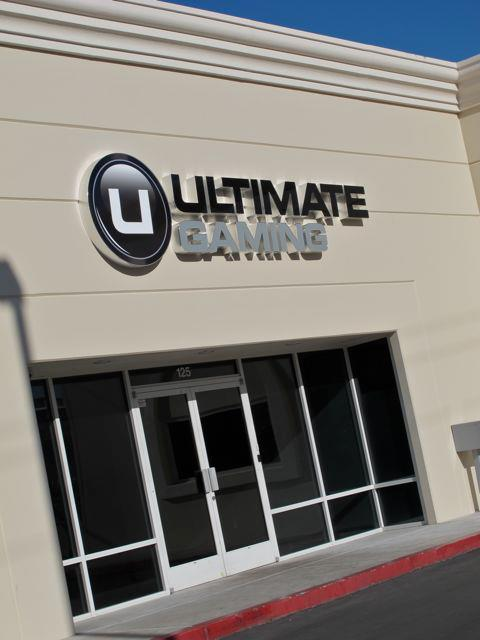
Vegas HQ for Ultimate Poker located at 3485 W. Harmon Ave

On November 14, 2014, parent company Ultimate Gaming closed down its Ultimate Poker operation because the Nevada-based site's revenues fell far short of projected expectations.
