= Matt Savage (poker director) =

American poker tournament director

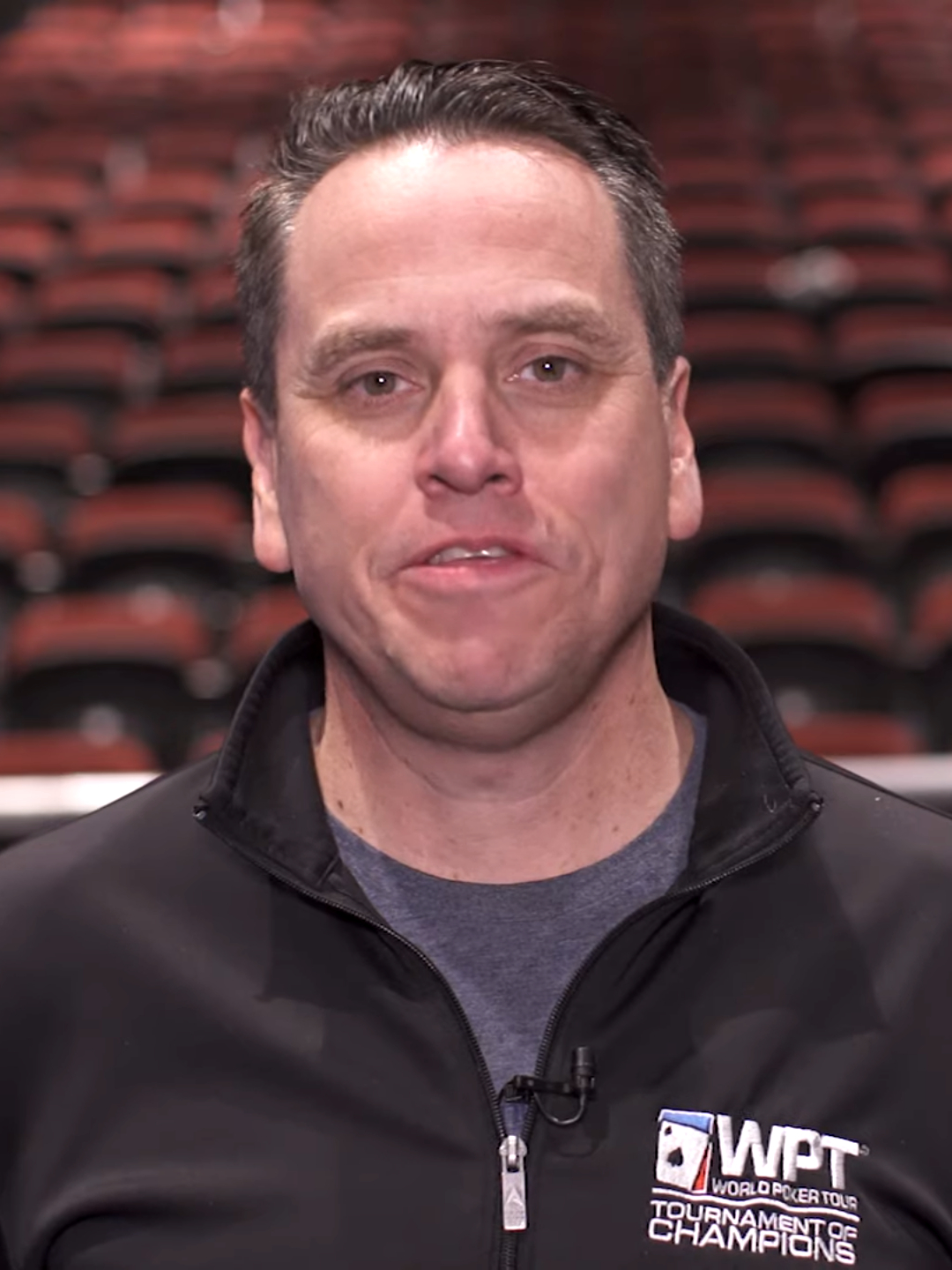
Matt Savage, 2019

Matt Savage is an American poker tournament director and is the Executive Tour Director of the World Poker Tour. He has officiated over 400 episodes of televised poker, a record, including the World Series of Poker (2002–2004) and WPT (2002-2019). He is still a TD at Commerce Casino, Bay 101, and Thunder Valley Casino Resort. Other events Savage has overseen include Ultimate Poker Challenge, Poker Dome Challenge, and King of Vegas. He has also worked with networks Fox News, FSN, Travel Channel, NBC, and ESPN and served a prominent roll in the Warner Brothers movie "Lucky You" alongside Eric Bana and Robert Duvall.

In 2001, Savage founded the Tournament Directors Association (TDA) along with Linda Johnson, Jan Fisher and David Lamb. The TDA is an organization that works to standardize poker tournament rules worldwide.

Savage was the inaugural inductee into the Poker Room Manager's Hall of Fame in 2003. Matt has been nominated for the Poker Hall of Fame multiple times.

Savage played during what was considered "the Poker Boom" and was on the microphone to call the 2003 WSOP final hand in which Chris Moneymaker defeated Sammy Farha.

Though Savage is not a professional poker player he has cashed multiple times, the first time in the World Series of Poker in 2009 including his first final table when he finished in fifth place in the $1,500 Seven Card Stud Hi-Low 8 or Better event. As of 2019, his live tournament winnings exceeded $125,000.
