= King of Vegas =

Television series

King of Vegas is a gambling series that first aired on Spike TV in the United States on January 17, 2006. It was hosted by boxing commentator Max Kellerman and co-hosted by handicapper Wayne Allyn Root, who gave color commentary and his odds-on favorites for each game. The tournament director was Matt Savage, who has also directed tournaments at the World Series of Poker.

== Format ==
Unlike other gambling series on television, King of Vegas includes competition in eight different casino games; four per week, all starting with blackjack and ending a final game of Texas Hold 'Em. All games are played with players getting a fresh set of $10,000 in chips (the format would later change a bit, but the $10,000 chip gain remained constant until the final episode). All games are played with limited hands/rounds to fit with the show's fast pace and hour-long time slot. All games have no limits on betting.

The show features twelve players, gathered by the producers/creators of the show. Six of the players are gambling pros of varied games and ages. The other six are unknowns in gambling, never having broken into the pro circuit of any game, some of which possibly involved in games on a small level (such as a card dealer). Each week, one player is eliminated, leaving the show with no prize whatsoever. The winner of the tournament takes home $1,000,000 and is crowned King of Vegas.

To start, the players are randomly divided into two groups. One half plays one game (called a "Round"), with a certain number of players with high scores going to the "Sitting Pretty" couch, meaning they are safe from elimination for that week. The other half then play a different casino game with a certain number of players again "Sitting Pretty." A third game is then played with the players who still haven't qualified. Again, a certain number "Sit Pretty." The episode then culminates in the "Texas Hold 'Em Deathmatch," which includes four players (until the final two episodes). Players try to double their chip stacks to automatically sit pretty. The first two players to Bust go to head-to-head "Sudden Death," same rules as Death Match, where the loser is out of the tournament.

When the player count thins down, the format changes a little bit. When six or less players are left in the competition, all players will play in all three opening games. At six players, all chips won in Round 2 carry over to Round 3. When five or fewer players are left, chips won in both Rounds 1 & 2 will carry on. All players still get a fresh $10,000 in chips at the beginning of all games, on top of whatever they carried over from previous rounds. At the end of the three games, the player on top of all the others in chip count goes to the Sitting Pretty couch while the rest go to the Death Match. When the show drops to three players left, there are no Sitting Pretty seats. Instead, the player with the lowest chip count is eliminated from the tournament after the first three games, and the remaining two players battle it out in the Death Match with $500,000 in chips each. Doubling the chips up wins the tournament and the King of Vegas title.

The show was recorded in a temporary studio constructed in the parking lot of Bally's Las Vegas.

== Players involved ==
=== Gambling pros ===
- Ken Einiger, Blackjack player
- Mike "The Mouth" Matusow, Poker player
- Evelyn Ng, Poker player
- "Hollywood Dave" Stann, Blackjack player
- David Williams, Poker player
- Joanna Wlodawer, Blackjack player

=== Amateur players ===
- Alan Borman, producer of TV & radio commercials
- "The Chainsaw" Steve Dempsey, plumber
- Jerry Goldberg, gambling retiree
- Todd Haushalter, casino administrator
- Gerald Brandon Fanning Betsy Layne High School graduate.
- Katie Porrello, dealer
- Josh MacDonald, Student

== Standings ==
=== Order of elimination ===
- Week 1 - Joanna Wlodawer, eliminated by Katie Porrello
- Week 2 - Todd Haushalter, eliminated by Jerry Goldberg
- Week 3 - Ken Einiger, eliminated by Katie Porrello
- Week 4 - Mike Matusow, eliminated by Evelyn Ng
- Week 5 - Gerald Brandon Fanning, eliminated by Katie Porrello
- Week 6 - Steve Dempsey, eliminated by David Williams
- Week 7 - Evelyn Ng, eliminated by Dave Stann
- Week 8 - Katie Porrello, eliminated by David Williams
- Week 9 - Dave Stann, eliminated by Alan Borman
- Week 10 - David Williams, eliminated due to chip count
- Week 10 - Jerry Goldberg, eliminated by Alan Borman
- King of Vegas - Alan Borman

=== Death match/sudden death records ===
- Joanna Wlodawer - Death Match: 0-1 / Sudden Death: 0-1
- Todd Haushalter - Death Match: 0-1 / Sudden Death: 0-1
- Ken Einiger - Death Match: 0-1 / Sudden Death: 0-1
- Mike Matusow - Death Match: 1-1 / Sudden Death: 0-1
- Gerald Brandon Fanning - Death Match: 1-1 / Sudden Death: 0-1
- Steve Dempsey - Death Match: 0-1 / Sudden Death: 0-1
- Evelyn Ng - Death Match: 0-2 / Sudden Death: 1-1
- Katie Porrello - Death Match: 2-4 / Sudden Death: 3-1
- Dave Stann - Death Match: 3-2 / Sudden Death: 1-1
- David Williams - Death Match: 3-2 / Sudden Death: 2-0
- Jerry Goldberg - Death Match: 3-1 / Sudden Death: 1-1
- Alan Borman - Death Match: 4-1 / Sudden Death: 2-0

== Games played ==
- Blackjack
- Caribbean Stud Poker
- Craps
- Horse racing
- Mini-Baccarat
- Pai Gow Poker
- Red Dog
- Roulette
- Texas Hold 'Em

== Episode summaries ==
=== Episode 1: Put Your Money Where Your Mouth Is ===
The first episode featured rounds of Blackjack, Caribbean Stud, and Roulette. Sitting Pretty seats were given in sets of 3, 3, and 2, leaving 4 players to play in the Death Match.

Round 1 featured Alan, Brandon Fanning, Dave, Evelyn, Ken, and Mike at the Blackjack table. Fanning swept the round with quiet strategy and a luck streak. Fanning, Alan, and Ken all won Sitting Pretty seats.

Round 2 featured David, Jerry, Joanna, Katie, Steve, and Todd playing Caribbean Stud. Joanna was a big talker, but couldn't get it together. Jerry, David, and Todd won the next 3 seats.

Round 3 featured Dave, Evelyn, Joanna, Katie, Mike, and Steve playing Roulette. In their second chances to sit pretty, Evelyn and Steve made some lucky bets and joined the other 6 on the couch.

The Death Match featured Dave, Joanna, Katie, and Mike. Dave and Mike quieted their loud mouths and concentrated on playing, and were able to outlast the girls and sit pretty.

Sudden Death featured pro Joanna versus amateur Katie. Katie upset the professional blackjack player with 8-8 over King-high, eliminating her from the tournament.

=== Episode 2: Clash of the Titans ===
The second episode featured rounds of Blackjack, Red Dog, and Craps. Sitting Pretty seats were given in sets of 3, 2, and 2, leaving 4 players to play in the Death Match.

Round 1 featured Alan, Dave, Jerry, Steve, Ken, and Todd playing Blackjack. The two loudmouths Dave and Steve came out on top along with Ken for the first 3 seats.

Round 2 featured Fanning, David, Evelyn, Katie, and Mike playing Red Dog. Mike seemed ready to start a rivalry with Fanning, but the ladies were able to outlast them for the next 2 seats.

Round 3 featured Alan, Fanning, David, Jerry, Todd, and Mike playing Craps. The dice didn't roll in the favorite Jerry's favor, and Alan & Mike won the last two seats.

The Death Match featured Fanning, David, Jerry, and Todd. Fanning and the ace David played solidly enough to outlast the round and sit pretty.

Sudden Death featured amateur Jerry versus amateur Todd. Jerry defeated the casino admin on the river with 7-7 over King-high, eliminating him from the tournament.

=== Episode 3: Hot Heads And Cold Cards ===
The third episode featured rounds of Blackjack, Mini-Baccarat, and Craps. Sitting Pretty seats were given in sets of 2, 2, and 2, leaving 4 players to play in the Death Match.

Round 1 featured Fanning, Dave, Jerry, Katie, and Steve playing Blackjack. The round featured a lot of trash talk between Dave and Steve, who both ended up sitting pretty.

Round 2 featured Alan, David, Evelyn, Ken, and Mike playing Mini-Baccarat. David stormed off once and was nearly DQed from the show. Evelyn and Mike ended up with the next 2 seats.

Round 3 featured Alan, Fanning, David, Jerry, Katie, and Ken playing Roulette. Katie tried to be ballsy, but fell short, and Fanning & David received the final 2 seats.

The Death Match featured Alan, Jerry, Ken, and Katie. It didn't last too long as Alan and Jerry played it smart, sending Ken & Katie to the final heads-up showdown.

Sudden Death featured amateur Katie vs. pro Ken. Katie got a miracle River card and defeated the radio host with 5-5-5 over K-K, eliminating him from the tournament.

=== Episode 4: Lady Luck ===
The fourth episode featured rounds of Blackjack, Pai Gow Poker, and Horse Racing. Sitting Pretty seats were given in sets of 2, 1, and 2, leaving 4 players to play in the Death Match.

Round 1 featured Fanning, Dave, David, Jerry, and Katie playing Blackjack. David led the pack first, but Blackjack ace Dave as well as Jerry earned the 2 Sitting Pretty seats.

Round 2 featured Alan, Evelyn, Mike, and Steve playing Pai Gow Poker. Chainsaw Steve was able to top two pro poker players and the confident Alan to get the only seat for the round.

Round 3 featured Alan, Fanning, David, Evelyn, Mike, and Katie playing Horse Racing. Fanning had homegrown advantage, and he was indeed able to take one seat, along with Katie for the final seat.

The Death Match featured Alan, David, Evelyn, and Mike. Alan is able to outsmart 3 professional poker players and sit pretty, with David Williams following close behind.

Sudden Death featured pro Evelyn vs. pro Mike. Evelyn catches "The Mouth" in a bluff and silences him with K-K-5-5 over 8-8-5-5, eliminating him from the tournament.

=== Episode 5: War of the Words ===
The fifth episode featured rounds of Blackjack, Red Dog, and Roulette. Sitting Pretty seats were given in sets of 1, 1, and 2, leaving 4 players to play in the Death Match.

Round 1 featured Alan, Evelyn, Jerry, and Katie playing Blackjack. Evelyn and Alan both busted, and Katie was unable to top the pro Jerry, who won the first couch seat.

Round 2 featured Fanning, Dave, David, and Steve playing Red Dog. David and Fanning bust out and leave the loudmouths to battle. Chainsaw topped Hollywood and grabbed the next seat.

Round 3 featured Alan, Fanning, Dave, David, Evelyn, and Katie playing Roulette. Katie, Dave, and Alan were quickly out, and Fanning's luck fell out as David and Evelyn sat pretty.

The Death Match featured Alan, Fanning, Dave, and Katie. Math whiz Dave doubled up first and sat pretty, followed quickly by Alan with Full House & Straight in back-to-back hands.

Sudden Death featured amateur Brandon vs. amateur Katie. Katie made a Full House on the turn, beating Gerald Brandon Fanning with A-A-A-J-J over A-A-A, eliminating him from the tournament.

=== Episode 6: Everybody's Game ===
The sixth episode featured rounds of Blackjack, Mini-Baccarat, and Craps. Sitting Pretty seats were given in sets of 1, 1, and 1, leaving 4 players to play in the Death Match.

Round 1 featured all 7 players playing Blackjack. Alan's short stack dooms him, and Steve's strategies all screw up. Evelyn becomes the sole player to sit pretty for the first round.

Round 2 featured all 6 remaining players playing Mini-Baccarat. David stays quiet, and the rest get loud. Everyone busts out before Dave and Katie, with Dave beating her at her own game.

Round 3 featured all 5 remaining players playing Craps. Alan is busted immediately, and David is soon to follow. Steve and Katie are then unable to beat Craps ace Jerry.

The Death Match featured Alan, David, Katie, and Steve. It was Steve's first appearance, and it wasn't nice to him. Alan and Katie distanced themselves quickly and sat pretty.

Sudden Death featured pro David vs. amateur Steve. David took out trashtaker 2 of 3, beating Steve with a 5-high Straight over Queen-high, eliminating him from the tournament.

=== Episode 7: House of Cards ===
The seventh episode featured rounds of Blackjack, Caribbean Stud, and Pai Gow Poker. Sitting Pretty seats were given in sets of 1, 0, and 1, leaving 4 players to play in the Death Match.

Round 1 featured all 6 players playing Blackjack. Alan emerges as the early chip leader and is able to knock an All-In Hollywood Dave out of his own game and get the first couch seat.

Round 2 featured all 5 remaining players playing Caribbean Stud. Chips in the game carried over to Round 3. David leaves the round with the chip lead, Dave being the only one to Bust.

Round 3 featured all 5 remaining players playing Pai Gow Poker. Evelyn is eliminated by David in the first hand, but David can't keep his lead as Jerry gets the 2nd seat of the night.

The Death Match featured Dave, David, Evelyn, and Katie. Evelyn is eliminated quickly, and David is able to double his stack. Katie then defeated Dave to send him to Sudden Death.

Sudden Death featured pro Dave vs. pro Evelyn. Everyone is pulling for Evelyn, but Dave is able to topple the pro with a pair of deuces, eliminating her from the tournament.

=== Episode 8: Hollywood's Darkest Hour ===
The eighth episode featured rounds of Blackjack, Red Dog, and Roulette. Only one sitting pretty seat was given after 3 games, leaving 4 players to play in the Death Match.

Round 1 featured all 5 players playing Blackjack. Alan is able to hit three 21s in a row, infuriating Hollywood Dave. Dave is the only player to bust, and Alan gets the chip lead.

Round 2 featured all 5 players playing Red Dog. David busts out early. Katie doubles her stack once, but busts out on another bet. Alan is able to keep his chip lead for Round 3.

Round 3 featured all 5 players playing Roulette. David and Katie bust out minutes in. Jerry and Dave are then unable to touch Alan's chip lead, the amateur getting the sole seat of the night.

The Death Match featured Dave, David, Jerry, and Katie. Jerry bets aggressively and throws off David to double his stack. Katie busts, and Dave defeats David to sit pretty.

Sudden Death featured pro David vs. amateur Katie. Katie has won 3 Sudden Deaths, but David is finally able to take out Cinderella girl, eliminating her from the tournament.

=== Episode 9: The Final Four ===
The ninth episode featured rounds of Blackjack, Horse Racing, and Pai Gow Poker. Only one sitting pretty seat was given after 3 games, leaving 3 players to play in the Death Match.

Round 1 featured all 4 players playing Blackjack. Alan busts out after Splitting. Jerry plays conservative and ends up in third, with Dave having a very small chip lead.

Round 2 featured all 4 players playing Horse Racing. Jerry's horse goes wire-to-wire and defeats David's horse by a neck. Jerry becomes the new chip leader with David & Dave trailing behind.

Round 3 featured all 4 players playing Pai Gow Poker. Hollywood Dave is able to win big, but not enough to catch David, who passes Jerry and gets one step closer to a million dollars.

The Death Match featured Alan, Dave, and Jerry. Jerry played aggressively and threw Dave and Alan off their toes, doubling his stack and sitting pretty with David.

Sudden Death featured amateur Alan vs. pro Dave. Worst rivals meet and after several hands, Alan takes Dave with 10-10 over Ace-high, eliminating him from the tournament.

=== Episode 10: Fight To The Finish ===
The tenth episode featured rounds of Blackjack, Mini-Baccarat, and Roulette. One player was eliminated after 3 games, leaving the final 2 players to battle for the title.

Round 1 featured all 3 players playing Blackjack. Jerry busts out in the final hand, and thanks to several Double Down 21s earlier in the game, David has a slim lead going to Round 2.

Round 2 featured all 3 players playing Mini-Baccarat. David busts out before the last hand. Jerry goes for the kill but misses out, and Alan gets a big chip lead for Round 3.

Round 3 featured all 3 players playing Roulette. A miracle 8 in Jerry's favor gives him the chip lead. David busts out on the final spin and is eliminated from the tournament.

The Death Match featured Alan and Jerry. Alan fell far behind, but a crucial All-In followed by catching Jerry with pocket Aces over A-5, and Alan won the King of Vegas tournament.

Alan is presented with a see-through briefcase full of money and a waitress soaks his trademark t-shirt in champagne. Jerry is also given a new cane in tribute to his tenacity.

== See also ==
- List of television shows set in Las Vegas
