= 2015 Jacksonville mayoral election =

- March 24, 2015 (blanket); May 19, 2015 (runoff)
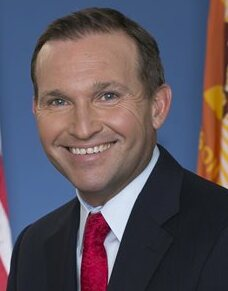

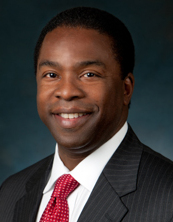

Nominee	Lenny Curry	Alvin Brown	Bill Bishop
Party	Republican	Democratic	Republican
First round vote	70,891	78,713	30,944
First round percentage	38.40%	42.64%	16.76%
Second round vote	103,626	98,349
Second round percentage	51.31%	48.69%
- Runoff results by precinct Curry: 50–60% 60–70% 70–80% 80–90% Brown: 50–60% 60–70% 70–80% 80–90% >90% Curry/Brown tie: 50%
Mayor before election
Alvin Brown
Democratic
Elected mayor
Lenny Curry
Republican

The 2015 Jacksonville mayoral election took place on March 24, 2015, to elect the Mayor of Jacksonville, Florida.

The election is a blanket primary, with all candidates from all parties running together on the same ballot. As no candidate received a majority of the vote, a runoff was held between the top two vote-getters on May 19, 2015.

Incumbent Democratic Mayor Alvin Brown ran for re-election to a second term in office. He was narrowly defeated by Republican Lenny Curry by a margin of 5,285 votes.

== Candidates ==
=== Democratic Party ===
Declared

- Alvin Brown, incumbent Mayor

=== Republican Party ===
Declared

- Bill Bishop, Jacksonville City Councilman
- Lenny Curry, former chairman of the Republican Party of Florida

Withdrew

- Jim Overton, Duval County Property Appraiser and former Jacksonville City Councilman

Declined

- Bill Gulliford, President of the Jacksonville City Council and former Mayor of Atlantic Beach
- Mike Hogan, Chairman of the Florida Public Employee Relations Commission and candidate for Mayor in 2011

=== Independent Party of Florida ===
Did not qualify

- Tiffany Wingo, student

=== Independent ===
Declared

- Omega Allen, former member of the Northwest Jacksonville Trust Fund Advisory Committee

Withdrew

- Marvin Kramer, retired attorney and prosecutor

== Primary election ==
=== Polling ===
Poll source	Date(s) administered	Sample size	Margin of error	Omega Allen (I)	Bill Bishop (R)	Alvin Brown (D)	Lenny Curry (R)	Other	Undecided
UNF	February 23–27, 2015	546	± 4%	2%	11%	37%	25%	<1%	25%
St. Pete Polls	January 23–25, 2015	1,247	± 2.8%	—	8.9%	37.9%	30.6%	15.7%	6.8%

=== Results ===
Jacksonville mayoral election, 2015
Party	Candidate	Votes	%
Democratic	Alvin Brown (incumbent)	78,713	42.64%
Republican	Lenny Curry	70,891	38.40%
Republican	Bill Bishop	30,944	16.76%
Independent	Omega Allen	4,046	2.19%
Total votes		184,594	100.00%

== Runoff ==
=== Polling ===
Poll source	Date(s) administered	Sample size	Margin of error	Alvin Brown (D)	Lenny Curry (R)	Undecided
St. Pete Polls	March 25, 2015	1,076	± 3.0%	49.4%	46.1%	4.5%
St. Pete Polls	January 23–25, 2015	1,247	± 2.8%	41.5%	45.3%	13.2%
University of North Florida	February 10–17, 2014	442	± 4.66%	45%	25%	30%

=== Results ===
Jacksonville mayoral election, 2015
Party	Candidate	Votes	%
Republican	Lenny Curry	103,626	51.31%
Democratic	Alvin Brown (incumbent)	98,349	48.69%
Total votes		201,975	100.00%
Republican gain from Democratic			

Hypothetical polling

Poll source	Date(s) administered	Sample size	Margin of error	Alvin Brown (D)	Bill Gulliford (R)	Undecided
University of North Florida	February 10–17, 2014	442	± 4.66%	43%	28%	29%

Poll source	Date(s) administered	Sample size	Margin of error	Alvin Brown (D)	Jim Overton (R)	Undecided
University of North Florida	February 10–17, 2014	442	± 4.66%	42%	31%	27%

Poll source	Date(s) administered	Sample size	Margin of error	Alvin Brown (D)	John Rutherford (R)	Undecided
University of North Florida	February 10–17, 2014	442	± 4.66%	41%	35%	24%

=== Endorsements ===
Alvin Brown
- Bill Nelson, U.S. senator (D-FL)
- Bill Bishop, City Councilman; finished third in the blanket primary
Lenny Curry
- Rick Scott, Governor of Florida
