= Blaise Ingoglia =

American politician (born 1970)

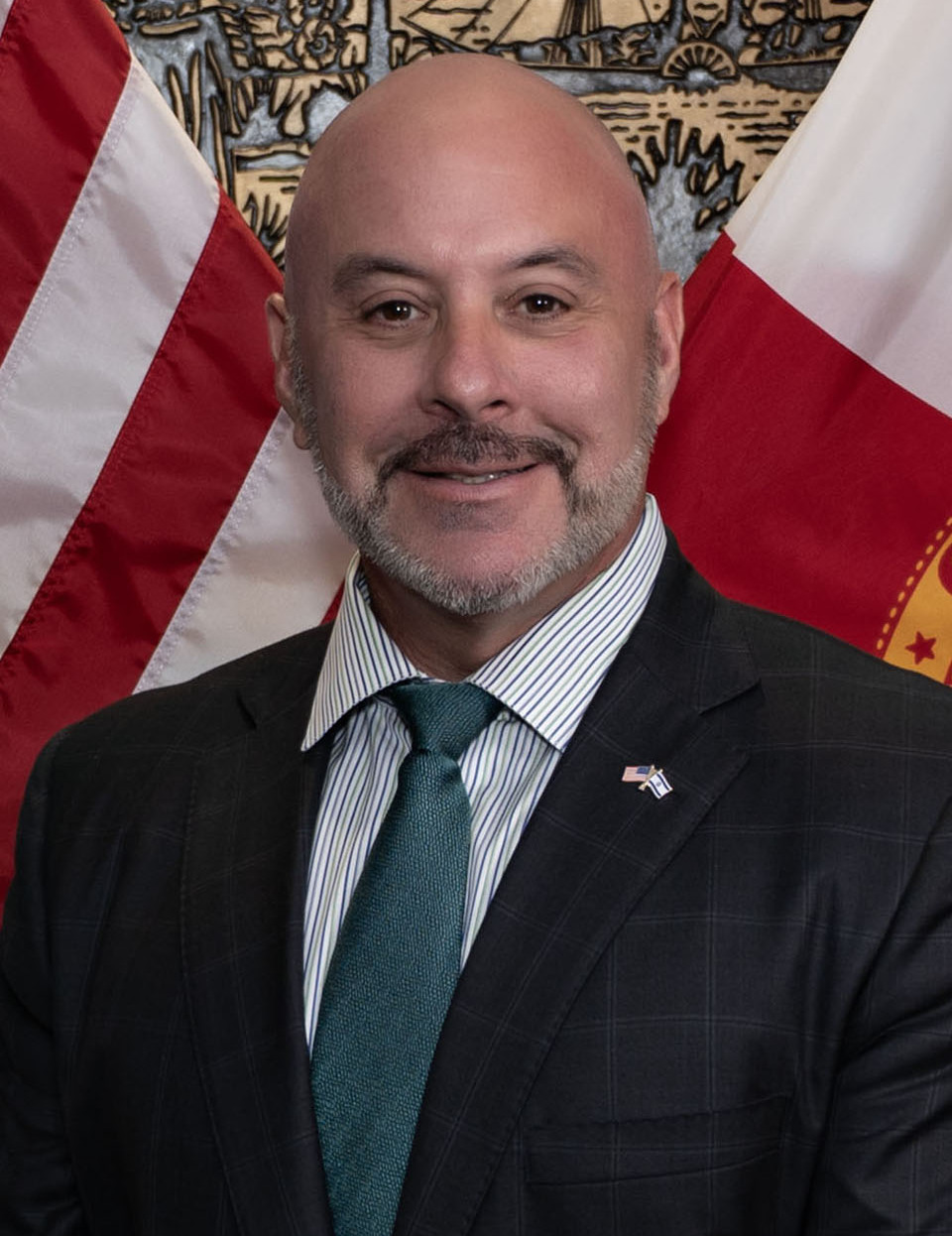
- Official portrait, 2025

5th Chief Financial Officer of Florida
- Incumbent
- Assumed office July 21, 2025
- Governor: Ron DeSantis; Byron Donalds (elect)
- Preceded by: Jimmy Patronis

Member of the Florida Senate from the 11th district
- In office November 8, 2022 – July 21, 2025
- Preceded by: Wilton Simpson (redistricted)
- Succeeded by: Ralph Massullo

Member of the Florida House of Representatives from the 35th district
- In office November 4, 2014 – November 8, 2022
- Preceded by: Rob Schenck
- Succeeded by: Fred Hawkins (redistricted)

Chair of the Florida Republican Party
- In office January 17, 2015 – January 12, 2019
- Preceded by: Leslie Dougher
- Succeeded by: Joe Gruters

Personal details
- Born: November 4, 1970 (age 56) New York City, U.S.
- Party: Republican
- Education: Queens College (attended); Brooklyn College (attended)
- Website: Office website Campaign website

Blaise Ingoglia (born November 4, 1970) is an American politician who has served as the fifth chief financial officer of Florida since July 2025. A member of the Republican Party, he previously served in the Florida Senate, representing the 11th district, from 2022 to 2025 and the Florida House of Representatives, representing the 35th district, from 2014 to 2022, as well as serving as chairman of the Republican Party of Florida from 2015 to 2019.

In February 2023, Ingoglia introduced a bill that would eliminate the Florida Democratic Party. During his tenure in the state legislature, Ingoglia was a staunch friend of Governor Ron DeSantis. In July 2025, Governor DeSantis appointed Ingoglia as Florida's chief financial officer, following the resignation of Jimmy Patronis to run for Congress.

== History ==
Ingoglia was born in Queens in New York City, and attended Queens College, and Brooklyn College, he did not graduate. In 1996, he moved to Spring Hill, Florida and started the companies America One Mortgage and Hartland Homes. He ran for office in 2008, spending nearly fifty thousand dollars of his own money "to unseat the career, big-government, tax-and-spend county commissioners from office that refused to offer property tax relief," an effort that was ultimately successful. Ingoglia was elected as the Chairman of the Hernando County Republican Executive Committee in 2009, and then was elected the Vice-Chairman of the Republican Party of Florida in 2011. In 2016 Ingoglia stepped down as Chairman of the Hernando County Republican Party when he was elected State Committeeman for Hernando County.

== Florida House of Representatives (2014–2022) ==
In 2014, incumbent State Representative Robert C. Schenck was unable to seek re-election due to term limits, so Ingoglia ran to succeed him. He won the Republican primary unopposed, and faced Democratic nominee Rose Rocco, a former Hernando County Commissioner, and independent candidates James Scavetta and Hamilton R. Hanson in the general election. Ultimately, Ingoglia defeated his opponents by a wide margin, winning 51% of the vote to Rocco's 42%, Scavetta's 4%, and Hanson's 3%.

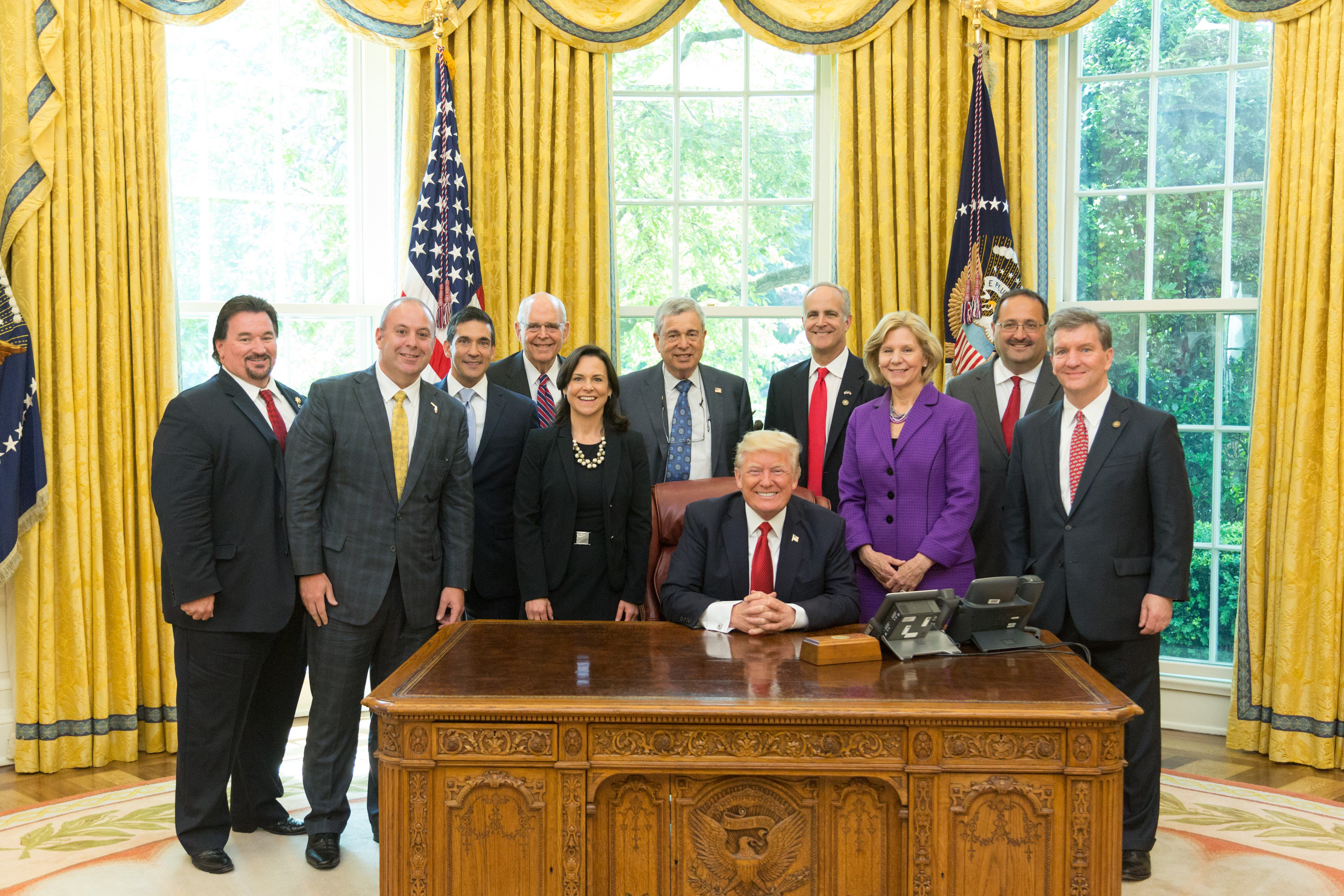
Ingoglia, second from left, with President Donald Trump in the Oval Office, May 2017

Following his election to the legislature, Ingoglia announced that he would seek election as the Chairman of the Republican Party of Florida, and successfully challenged and defeated the incumbent Chairwoman, Leslie Dougher. He was reelected as state party chair in January 2017, defeating Christian Ziegler.

Ingoglia and other Republicans proposed changes to restrict voting rights in Florida. The proposed changes to restrict mail-in voting were notable given that Republicans had traditionally voted by mail more than Democrats, but Democrats outvoted Republicans by mail in 2020. Asked about cases of voter fraud, Ingoglia said, "I don’t know, but I'm sure it was going on. Just the fact that they weren’t caught doesn’t necessarily mean that it's not happening."

Ingoglia also proposed legislation that prohibit technology companies from "deplatforming" political candidates (several social media companies had removed President Donald Trump from their platform. Ingoglia made an exemption for The Walt Disney Company, which runs Walt Disney World in Florida.

== Florida Senate (2022–2025) ==
In 2022, Ingoglia was term-limited in the state house and ran for the Florida Senate in the 11th district, succeeding Republican Senate president Wilton Simpson. He ran against Green nominee Brian Moore in the general election, defeating him with 75% of the vote.

In February 2023, Ingoglia filed SB 1248, titled the "Ultimate Cancel Act," that would cancel the filings of any political party that previously supported slavery or involuntary servitude, automatically changing the registration of affected voters to "no party affiliation." The bill was created in an attempt to outlaw the Florida Democratic Party, which historically supported slavery before and during the American Civil War, as well as a criticism of cancel culture, stating that it would be "hypocritical not to cancel the Democrat Party [sic] itself."

In 2024, he sponsored a bill to abolish police review boards.

== Chief Financial Officer of Florida (2025–present) ==
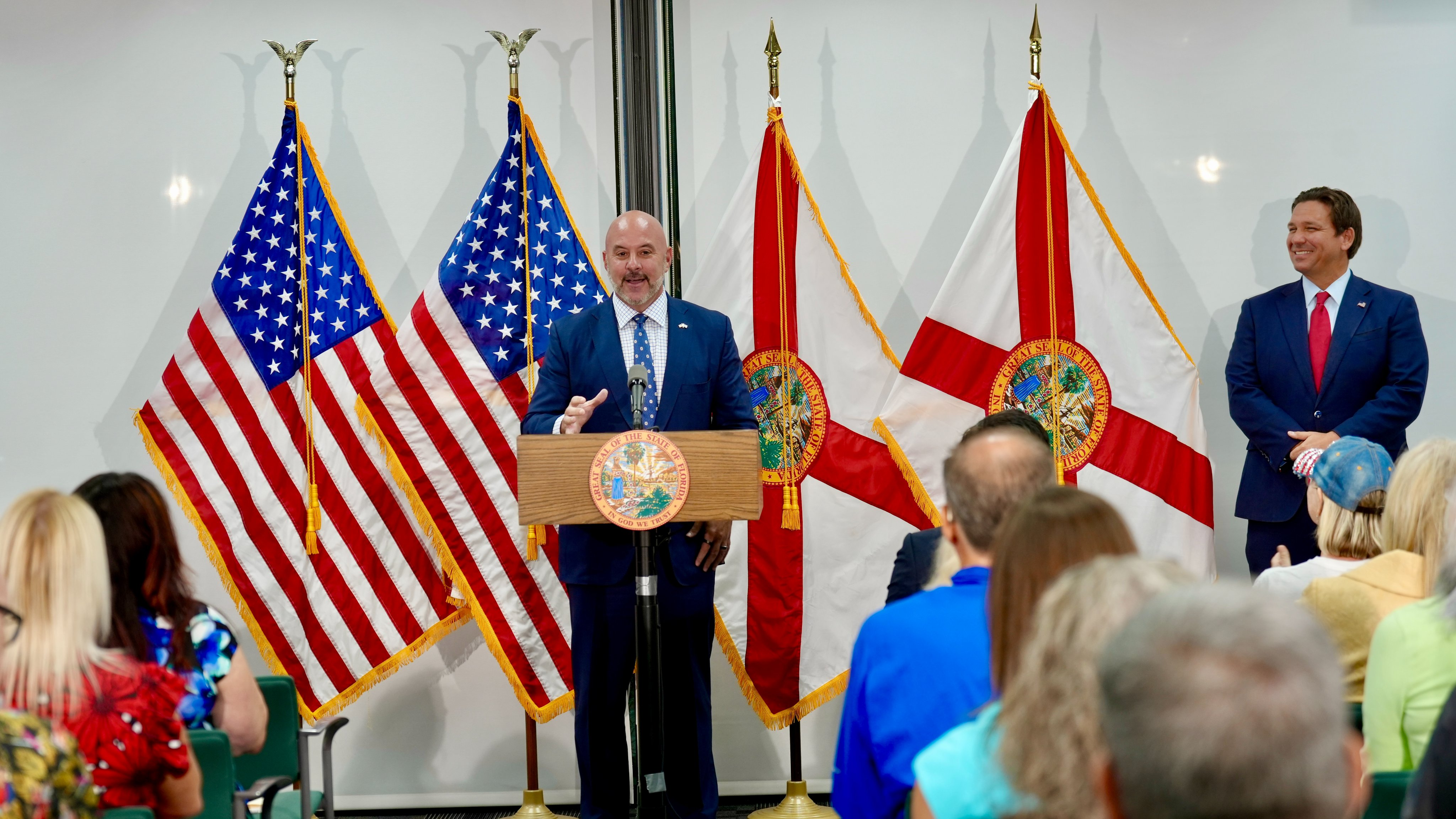
Ingoglia speaking at a Florida DOGE event in Broward County, Florida, alongside Governor Ron DeSantis, July 2025

On July 16, 2025, Governor Ron DeSantis appointed Ingoglia as the 5th chief financial officer of Florida. In July 2025, Ingoglia began a statewide speaking tour for the Florida Department of Government Efficiency, alongside Governor Ron DeSantis. In October 2025, armed agents threatened a Vietnam veteran for sending Ingoglia a post card saying, "You lack values." Characterized by many as an attempt to stifle free speech, his office dismissed those complaints saying they needed a threat assessment.

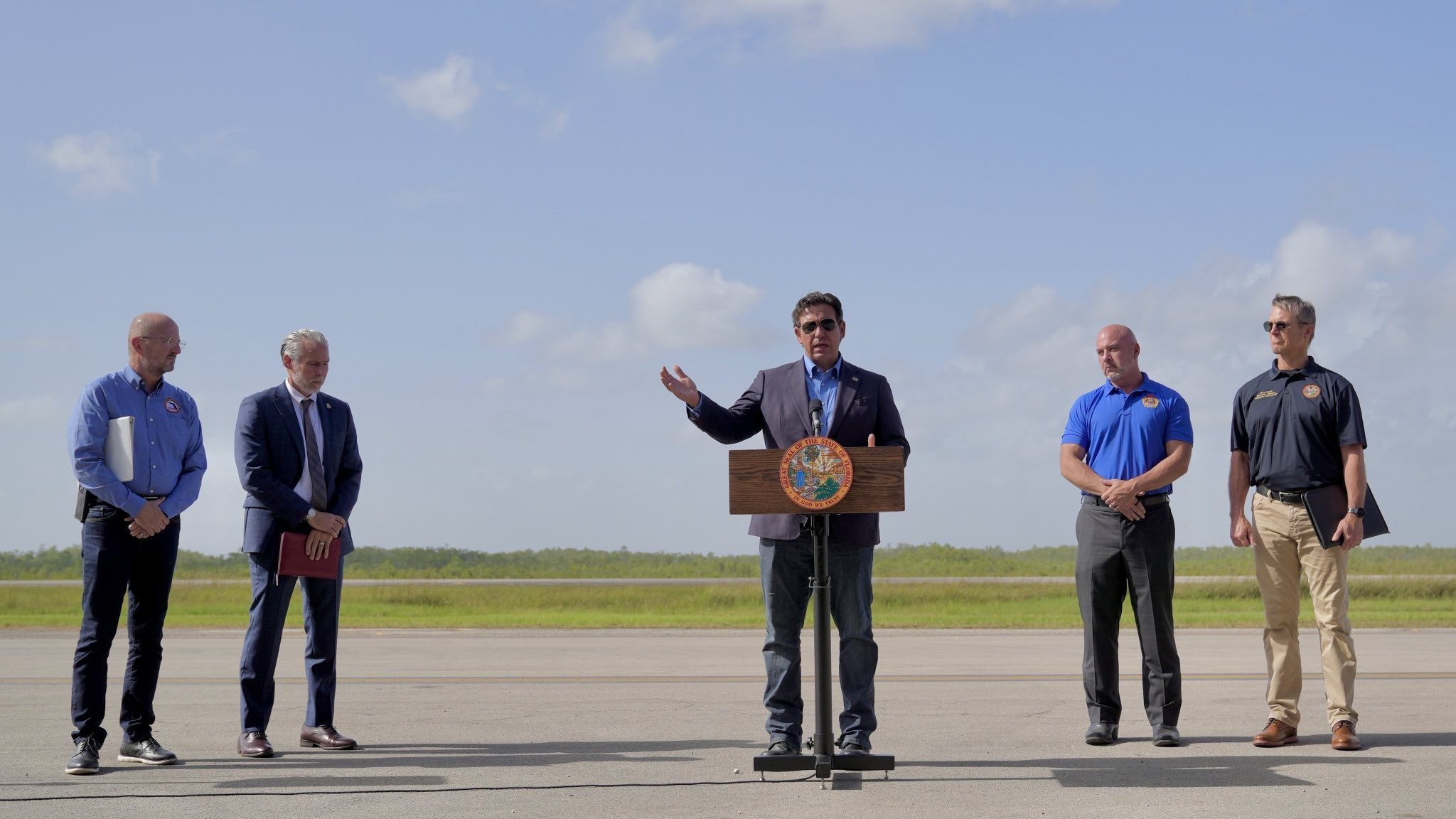
Ingoglia with Governor DeSantis at Alligator Alcatraz in July 2025

== Personal life ==
Ingoglia lives in Spring Hill, Florida. He has a self-published net worth of US$28.3 million, as of 2022. He is an internationally ranked, professional poker player.

Party political offices
Preceded by Leslie Dougher	Chair of the Florida Republican Party; 2015–2019	Succeeded by Joe Gruters
Political offices
Preceded by Susan Miller; Acting	Chief Financial Officer of Florida; 2025–present	Incumbent
