= PokerNews =

Poker publication

PokerNews.com
- Type: Private
- Industry: Poker
- Founded: 2002
- Founder: Antanas Guoga
- Headquarters: Isle of Man
- Key people: Jon Squires (CEO); Jon Sykes (Director); David Bufton (CFO); Justinas Bėčius (CTO)
- Owner: iBus Media
- Website: pokernews.com

PokerNews is a poker news website. It publishes industry news, live tournament coverage, strategy articles, player interviews, videos and podcasts, along with information on bonuses and freeroll tournaments at online poker rooms. Antanas Guoga founded the site in 2002. It is run by iBus Media, which Flutter Entertainment sold to the investment firm Bruin Capital in 2021 as part of Oddschecker Global Media.

== History ==
Antanas "Tony G" Guoga, a Lithuanian-Australian businessman, founded the site in 2002. Guoga bought the domain name PokerNews.com for $6,000, hired a couple of programmers to set up the site, and began publishing articles. As of 2011, PokerNews offered native language sites in Germany, France, Netherlands, Italy, Russia, Poland, Australia, China, Portugal, Japan, Norway, and more.

In 2011, Sarah Grant was hired to host videos by PokerNews and PokerStars covering events all over the world.

In November 2005, PokerNews launched its UK edition. In January 2006, the Swedish language site was launched. In May 2006, another Scandinavian site launched as PokerNews Norway. One month later, a Greek edition launched. A Danish language site followed in August 2006. In January 2007, PokerNews Israel launched in Hebrew. Also that month, PokerNews Romania launched. In April 2007, PokerNews Czech launched. The Bulgarian version was launched in May 2007, followed by a Slovenian version. In October 2007, PokerNews Ukraine launched.

In May 2007, PokerNews was named the exclusive Live Reporting Partner to World Series of Poker, replacing previous partner Card Player magazine. PokerNews produces and provides live play-by-play updates and chip counts for publication on the World Series of Poker website, as well as on PokerNews.com.

PokerNews has covered events all over the world including those on the European Poker Tour, Asia Pacific Poker Tour, Caribbean Poker Tour, World Poker Tour, Aussie Millions, Latin American Poker Tour, UK and Ireland Poker Tour, National Heads-Up Poker Championship, and the World Series of Poker.

On September 8, 2013, PokerNews' Head of Content Matthew Parvis conducted an interview with Howard Lederer that was released as a seven-part series titled, "Lederer Files". During the seven-hour interview, Lederer discussed the collapse of Full Tilt Poker, the board, the investors, Ray Bitar, Chris Ferguson, Phil Ivey and Black Friday. Each episode was roughly 30 minutes in length.

In May 2013, PokerNews released MyStack, an iPhone and Android app. Players in tournaments covered by PokerNews could use it to post their own chip counts, comments and photos to the site's live reporting feed.

From 2013 to 2016, PokerNews won the Best Poker Affiliate award at the iGB Affiliate Awards.

Guoga sold stakes in iBus Media to The Stars Group, which owned a majority of the company by 2017. In January 2019, iBus Media merged with the odds comparison site Oddschecker, which the Stars Group had acquired with Sky Betting & Gaming. The merged business took the name Oddschecker Global Media. Flutter took over the group when it merged with the Stars Group in 2020. On 31 August 2021, Flutter sold Oddschecker Global Media, whose brands included PokerNews, to the private equity firm Bruin Capital.

In 2018, several record labels sued iBus Media, including Universal Music Group, Roc-A-Fella Records, Capitol Records and PolyGram. They alleged that podcasts produced by iBus Media had used copyrighted songs without paying for their use.
