= Florida Department of Revenue =

Statewide regulatory entity in Florida

Florida Department of Revenue is a state agency of Florida concerned with taxes. It is headquartered in Tallahassee.
