= Lex Veldhuis =

Dutch poker player (born 1983)

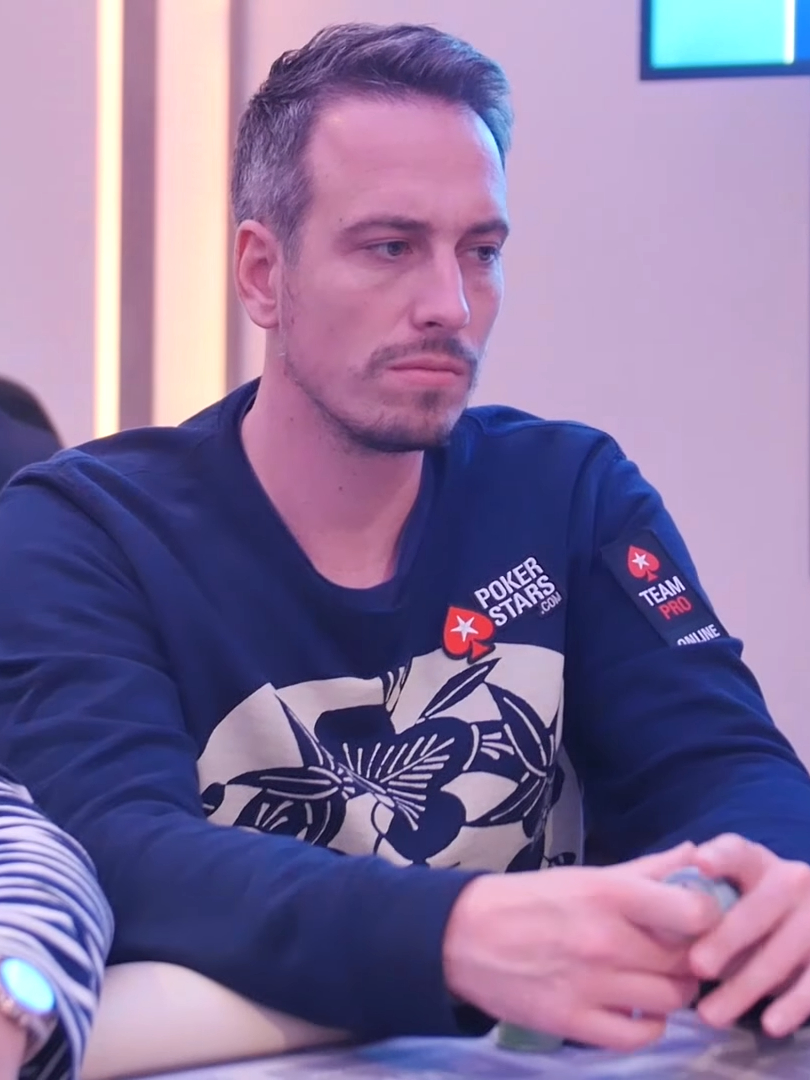
- Veldhuis in 2017
- Nicknames: RaSZi; The 7bettor from Deeper Space
- Born: 29 December 1983 (age 42); Vlissingen, Netherlands

World Series of Poker
- Final table: 1
- Money finishes: 13

World Poker Tour
- Money finish: 1

European Poker Tour
- Money finishes: 5

Alexander Bastiaan Martin "Lex" Veldhuis (born 29 December 1983) is a Dutch professional poker player and Twitch and YouTube streamer from Vlissingen, Netherlands.

Veldhuis was a StarCraft player. During an international event, he met the French poker player Bertrand Grospellier. Grospellier inspired Veldhuis to play online poker. In 2005, Grospellier deposited Veldhuis' first $10 at PokerStars.

Later he played live tournaments as well, but was not used to the slow pace. Online, he was used to playing fast at multiple tables at a time. He often complained about the pace of live poker. He met professional tennis player Raemon Sluiter, who advised him about sports mentality. Later Veldhuis helped and mentored Sluiter's girlfriend Fátima Moreira de Melo with her professional poker career.

Veldhuis was knocked out of the main event of the 2009 World Series of Poker on day 2 after finishing high in day 1.

Veldhuis was a member of Pokerstars Pro Team Online and streams high/mid-stakes tournaments on PokerStars with average monthly buy-ins of US$40K on Twitch. He is considered a major poker personality in the industry. In 2020, Veldhuis finished 15th in the PokerStars SCOOP Main Event, winning $62,620. During this event, his stream was watched by a peak of 58,799 viewers, a record for poker streamers.

Veldhuis plays an aggressive game – not uncommon of double- or triple-barrel bluffs (bluffing second and third betting round). Although this can be said for many players – not many do it after a single raise preflop.

His live poker winnings exceed US$700,000.

== Departure from PokerStars and return to streaming (2026) ==
On 3 January 2026, Veldhuis announced his departure from PokerStars, ending a 17-year ambassador partnership — one of the longest in poker history. Veldhuis's streaming career on PokerStars had been disrupted since November 2021, when the site exited the Netherlands market following an order from Kansspelautoriteit (KSA), the Dutch gambling regulator. This forced him to commute to Belgium to continue streaming for nearly three years, before he stopped streaming poker entirely in late 2024.

Now operating as a free agent, Veldhuis returned to streaming in January 2026 on GGPoker, which holds a Dutch licence allowing him to play from home in the Netherlands. He reclaimed the #1 spot in Twitch's Poker category for the month, averaging 2,034 concurrent viewers across approximately 190 hours of streaming.
