= Poker Royale =

American reality television series

- Genre: Game show
- Presented by: Kevin Nealon; Tom Leykis; Lisa Kennedy Montgomery; John Ahlers
- Country of origin: United States
- Original language: English
- No. of seasons: 3
- No. of episodes: 48

Original release
- Network: Game Show Network (GSN)
- Release: December 7, 2004 – December 9, 2005

Poker Royale is a television series on the Game Show Network (GSN), which featured No Limit Texas hold 'em Poker.

The first series began on December 7, 2004. The eighth and final series, Poker Royale: Young Bloods II, began airing on December 9, 2005. The series host at its conclusion was John Ahlers, with commentary by Robert Williamson III and sideline reporting by Lisa Dergan.

== The series ==
=== Poker Royale: The WPPA Championship ===
The first series was based on the championship of the World Poker Players Association. The show was hosted by Kevin Nealon, with commentary by Williamson (Evelyn Ng provided commentary for the first two episodes). Suzanne Freeman provided sideline reporting. A total of 72 players participated and put up the $5,000 entrance fee.

Unlike later series, this series was done in a tournament-style format where players who had zero chips were eliminated. Also different from other series were that three tables were active during the early episodes, and was later lowered to the top ten players at the main table in center stage.

This was the only series where there was a contest for viewers. During intervals of the program, various poker buzzwords would appear on screen. Viewers would log into GSN's website and input this word for a chance to win up to $10,000,000 in a poker hand with the winner of the WPPA championship.

In order to win the grand prize, the poker tournament winner had to get a full house or better by choosing 5 cards from a deck at random (each card was sealed in an envelope). James Van Alstyne won the tournament and shared an additional $30,000 with a member of GSN's website, in addition to the cash received, they each won a year's supply of pizza from Pizza Hut.

==== Results ====
Position	Competitor	Prize Money
1st	James Van Alstyne	$125,420
2nd	Lee Markholt	$65,305
3rd	Paul Wolfe	$46,505
4th	Juan Carlos Mortensen	$32,125
5th	Bill Carroll	$22,320
6th	Kathy Liebert	$17,285
7th	Johannes Murez	$14,100
8th	Vinh Truong	$12,000
9th	Jesse Jones	$10,540

=== Poker Royale: Battle of the Sexes ===
Poker Royale: Battle of the Sexes was the second series, hosted by radio personality Tom Leykis and Kennedy. Additional commentary was by Williamson once again, except for preliminary match #6, when Matt Vasgersian covered for him. Suzanne Freeman again returned as sideline reporter.

As opposed to the previous series, this one relied on males vs. females, which also incorporated the current scoring format, where players would be awarded points for their teams, depending on how they finished in that particular episode (one point for finishing sixth place to six points for finishing first). The six players (three each of men and women) who had the highest points played in a grand final with the same rules as above, and the highest team score won the tournament and the 6 teammates split a $30,000 bonus ($5,000 each) each daily winner also received $20,000, each finalist received a $5,000 bonus and the tournament's overall winner won $40,000. Kathy Liebert won the tournament and a total of $50,000. Despite losing all 6 preliminary games the women scored the most points at the final table to capture the $30,000 bonus.

The men were Chris Moneymaker, Paul Wolfe, Greg Raymer, Amir Vahedi, Layne Flack and Antonio Esfandiari. The women were Kathy Liebert, Jennifer Harman, Evelyn Ng, Karina Jett, Kristy Gazes and Clonie Gowen.

==== Results ====
Episode	Winner	Prize	Other Finalists
Preliminary Match 1	Amir Vahedi	$20,000	Karina Jett; Clonie Gowen; Kathy Liebert; Paul Wolfe; Chris Moneymaker
Preliminary Match 2	Layne Flack	$20,000	Antonio Esfandiari; Evelyn Ng; Kristy Gazes; Greg Raymer; Jennifer Harman
Preliminary Match 3	Paul Wolfe	$20,000	Kristy Gazes; Evelyn Ng; Chris Moneymaker; Layne Flack; Karina Jett; Scotty Gelt
Preliminary Match 4	Antonio Esfandiari	$20,000	Kathy Liebert; Jennifer Harman; Greg Raymer; Amir Vahedi; Clonie Gowen
Preliminary Match 5	Amir Vahedi	$20,000	Layne Flack; Clonie Gowen; Evelyn Ng; Chris Moneymaker; Jennifer Harman
Preliminary Match 6	Greg Raymer	$20,000	Karina Jett; Kathy Liebert; Paul Wolfe; Antonio Esfandiari; Kristy Gazes
Grand Final	Kathy Liebert	$50,000	Layne Flack ($5,000); Evelyn Ng ($10,000); Amir Vahedi ($5,000); Karina Jett ($10,000); Antonio Esfandiari ($5,000)

Total Winnings:

Women: Kathy Liebert $50,000 ($40,000 for the tournament, $5,000 for winning the battle of the sexes, $5,000 for reaching the final table) Karina Jett $10,000 ($5,000 for winning the battle of the sexes, $5,000 for reaching the final table) Evelyn Ng $10,000 ($5,000 for winning the battle of the sexes, $5,000 for reaching the final table) Clonie Gowen $5,000 ($5,000 for winning the battle of the sexes) Kristy Gazes $5,000 ($5,000 for winning the battle of the sexes) Jennifer Harman: $5,000 ($5,000 for winning the battle of the sexes)

Men: Amir Vahedi: $45,000 (2 Preliminary wins + $5,000 for reaching the final table) Layne Flack: $25,000 (1 Preliminary win + $5,000 for reaching the final table) Antonio Esfandiari: $25,000 (1 Preliminary wins + $5,000 for reaching the final table) Paul Wolfe: $20,000 (1 Preliminary win) Greg Raymer: $20,000 (1 Preliminary win) Chris Moneymaker: $0

=== Poker Royale: Celebrities vs. Poker Pros ===
Poker Royale: Celebrities vs. Poker Pros featured famous poker players playing against celebrities. As before, the scoring system was used, but was altered (10 points for finishing first down to 0 points for finishing last). The six highest point-scorers would play in the grand final for the championship.

The celebrities who participated in this tournament were Lance Bass, Jennifer Tilly, Mimi Rogers, Morris Chestnut, Patrick Warburton, and Traci Bingham. They faced poker players Scott Fischman, Kathy Liebert, Cyndy Violette, Roxanne Rhodes, Paul Darden, and "Cowboy" Kenna James. John Ahlers became the permanent host with this series and Lisa Dergen became permanent sideline reporter. Matt Savage and Bill Bruce were the Tournament Directors.

Patrick Warburton was the eventual winner and received $50,000, Preliminary match winners each received $5,000, finalists won a $5,000 bonus.

=== Poker Royale: Young Bloods ===
Poker Royale: Young Bloods was a live special that premiered on May 20, 2005. It initially ran approximately 2 hours 15 minutes. Subsequent airings were edited for a two-hour timeslot. All the players were under the age of 30. Players were awarded cash prizes based on the order of finish. The winner received $20,000, second place $10,000, and third-sixth received $5,000. The players were Michael Mizrachi, David Williams, Michael Sandberg, Erin Ness, Erica Schoenberg, and Scott Fischman. There were two final table events between these players. In the first event, Williams defeated Ness heads-up to take the win. Sandberg took third. In the second event, Williams outlasted Sandberg heads-up. Mizrachi took third.

=== Poker Royale: Comedians vs. Poker Pros ===
Poker Royale: Comedians vs. Poker Pros was similar to Celebrities vs. Poker Pros, but with stand-up comedians in lieu of celebrities. This series had more preliminary games than in previous series (ten instead of the previous six). The comedians were Paul Rodriguez, Robert Wuhl, Mark Curry, Tammy Pescatelli, Carol Leifer, and Sue Murphy. They faced off against poker players Phil Laak, Robert Williamson III, Linda Johnson, David Williams, Connie Kim, and Kathy Kolberg. Since Williamson was a competitor, "Cowboy" Kenna James took the commentator spot for this series. In this tournament the top 2 comedians and top 2 pros were guaranteed a place in the finale with the next top 3 of each team having to earn a spot through the wild card game played for no money. Phil Laak won the tournament and the $50,000 grand prize, Kathy Kolberg finished runner-up and received $10,000.

==== Results ====
Episode	Winner	Prize	Other Finalists
Preliminary Match 1	Phil Laak	$5,000	Kathy Kolberg; Sue Murphy; David Williams; Paul Rodriguez; Robert Wuhl
Preliminary Match 2	Phil Laak	$5,000	Robert Wuhl; Carol Leifer; Robert Williamson III; Connie Kim; Paul Rodriguez
Preliminary Match 3	Carol Leifer	$5,000	Linda Johnson; Tammy Pescatelli; Robert Williamson III; Mark Curry; David Williams
Preliminary Match 4	Kathy Kolberg	$5,000	David Williams; Tammy Pescatelli; Linda Johnson; Mark Curry; Sue Murphy
Preliminary Match 5	Robert Williamson III	$5,000	Phil Laak; Kathy Kolberg; Paul Rodriguez; Mark Curry (tied); Carol Leifer (tied)
Preliminary Match 6	Tammy Pescatelli	$5,000	Robert Williamson III; Phil Laak; Sue Murphy; David Williams; Carol Leifer
Preliminary Match 7	Linda Johnson	$5,000	Kathy Kolberg; Mark Curry; Paul Rodriguez; Robert Wuhl; Connie Kim
Preliminary Match 8	Linda Johnson	$5,000	Connie Kim; Paul Rodriguez; Sue Murphy; Tammy Pescatelli; Robert Williamson III
Preliminary Match 9	David Williams	$5,000	Tammy Pescatelli; Connie Kim; Robert Wuhl; Carol Leifer; Kathy Kolberg
Preliminary Match 10	Mark Curry	$5,000	Sue Murphy; Phil Laak; Connie Kim; Linda Johnson; Robert Wuhl
Wild Card Match	Kathy Kolberg	None	Sue Murphy; Robert Williamson III; Paul Rodriguez; David Williams; Carol Leifer
Grand Final	Phil Laak	$55,000	Kathy Kolberg ($15,000); Linda Johnson ($5,000); Tammy Pescatelli ($5,000); Sue Murphy ($5,000); Mark Curry ($5,000)

=== Poker Royale: The James Woods Gang vs the Unabombers ===
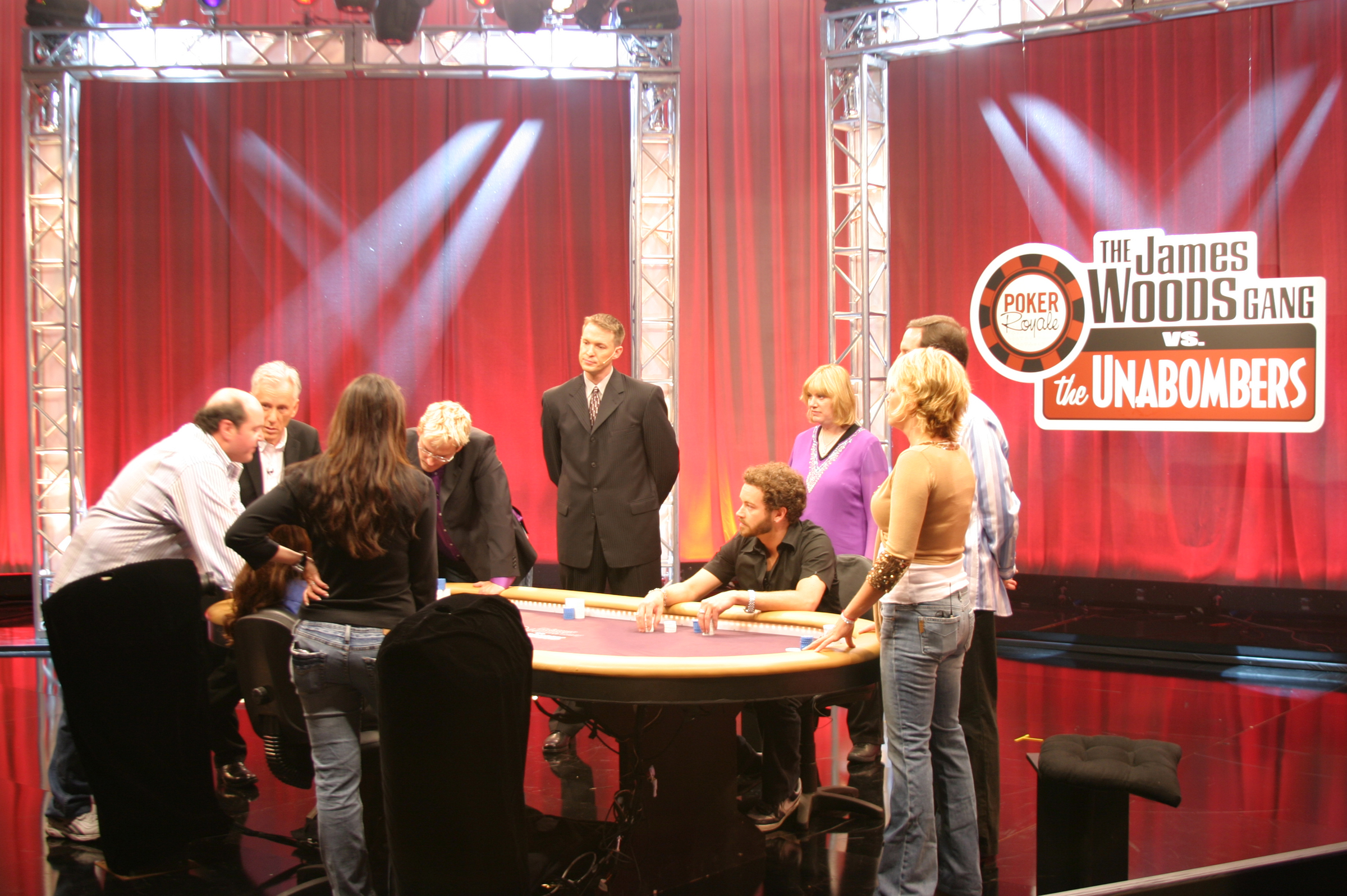
James Woods and other poker players about to begin their Poker game at Pechanga Casino

Poker Royale: The James Woods Gang vs. the Unabombers featured two teams featuring celebrities and poker pros. Once again, the point system was used, but this time points were combined into a total score for the whole team as opposed to scores for individual players. In the grande finale, each team captain and 2 team members of his choice divided this total multiplied by $10,000 in chips (choosing who would get the extra chips if it could not be divided evenly), each preliminary winner received $5,000, the winning team split $50,000, while the overall individual winner won $25,000. The James Woods Gang was led by celebrity and poker player James Woods, and had celebrities Nicole Sullivan, and Bob Goen, plus poker players Kathy Liebert, Ted Forrest, and Susie Isaacs. The Unabombers were led by Phil Laak. His team had celebrities Jennifer Tilly, Danny Masterson, and Gail O'Grady, plus poker players Hasan Habib and Cyndy Violette. Matt Savage and Bill Bruce returned as the Tournament Directors.

==== Results ====
Episode	Winner	Prize	Other Finalists
Preliminary Match 1	Cyndy Violette	$5,000	Danny Masterson; Phil Laak; Kathy Liebert; Ted Forrest; James Woods
Preliminary Match 2	Hasan Habib	$5,000	Nicole Sullivan; Jennifer Tilly; Gail O'Grady; Susie Isaacs; Bob Goen
Preliminary Match 3	Ted Forrest	$5,000	Nicole Sullivan; Jennifer Tilly; Gail O'Grady; Susie Isaacs; Phil Laak
Preliminary Match 4	Kathy Liebert	$5,000	Cyndy Violette; Bob Goen; Hasan Habib; James Woods; Danny Masterson
Preliminary Match 5	Kathy Liebert	$5,000	Nicole Sullivan; Danny Masterson; Phil Laak; Bob Goen; Cyndy Violette
Preliminary Match 6	James Woods	$5,000	Hasan Habib; Gail O'Grady; Jennifer Tilly; Susie Isaacs; Ted Forrest
Grand Final	Phil Laak	$25,000 *	Kathy Liebert; Cyndy Violette; Hasan Habib; James Woods; Ted Forrest

* $25,000 to Grand Final winner, $50,000 to winning team. Team captains pick two team members to take part in the final.

=== Poker Royale: Battle of the Ages ===
Poker Royale: Battle of the Ages was the most recent series of Poker Royale. This one featured six poker players over the age of 60 playing against six players under the age of 30. The older players were T. J. Cloutier, "Action" Dan Harrington, "Miami" John Cernuto, Barbara Enright, Maureen Feduniak, and Wendeen Eolis. The younger players were Michael Gracz, Dutch Boyd, Erin Ness, Evelyn Ng, Jennifer Leigh, and Kasey Thompson. A bounty was introduced for each episode. At the beginning of each show each player would be dealt a card, the one with the ace of spades would be the "bounty" if he or she lost whoever eliminated them won a $1,000 bonus. (splitting the prize if more than one player was involved) if he/she went on to win they would receive the $1,000 bonus. Matt Savage and Bill Bruce were, once again, the Tournament Directors.

==== Results ====
Episode	Winner	Prize	Other Finalists
Preliminary Match 1	Jennifer Leigh	$5,000	John Cernuto; Evelyn Ng ^{2}; Dan Harrington ^{1}; T. J. Cloutier; Erin Ness
Preliminary Match 2	Michael Gracz	$5,000	Wendeen Eolis ^{2}; Kasey Thompson; Barbara Enright; Dutch Boyd ^{1}; Maureen Feduniak
Preliminary Match 3	Dan Harrington ^{1, 2}	$5,000	John Cernuto; Dutch Boyd; Michael Gracz; T. J. Cloutier; Kasey Thompson
Preliminary Match 4	Erin Ness ^{3}	$5,000	Wendeen Eolis ^{3}; Barbara Enright; Maureen Feduniak ^{1}; Evelyn Ng; Jennifer Leigh
Preliminary Match 5	T. J. Cloutier ^{2}	$5,000	Wendeen Eolis; Michael Gracz ^{1}; Barbara Enright; Kasey Thompson; Evelyn Ng
Preliminary Match 6	Jennifer Leigh ^{2}	$5,000	Dan Harrington; Erin Ness; John Cernuto ^{1}; Maureen Feduniak; Dutch Boyd
Grand Final	Dan Harrington	$50,000	Michael Gracz ($10,000) ^{2}; John Cernuto ^{4}; Wendeen Eolis; Jennifer Leigh ^{1}; Erin Ness

^{1} $1,000 bounty on this player
^{2} bounty winner
^{3} joint bounty winners
^{4} $400 bounty on this player

=== Poker Royale: Young Bloods II ===
Poker Royale: Young Bloods II was another special featuring poker players under 30, and aired on December 9, 2005. This special featured the same players and format as the first Young Bloods.

Kenna James once again did commentary instead of Williamson for this special.

== Airings ==
GSN aired new episodes of Poker Royale every Friday evening from 10:00 p.m. to 11:00 p.m. EST, part of their Casino Night block (the block has since moved to Mondays, and does not feature Poker Royale). Episodes of previous seasons are rerun occasionally on GSN.

As of 2006, GSN does not intend to do any more Poker Royale shows. A cash game poker show titled High Stakes Poker premiered on January 16, 2006 on GSN. This series is unrelated to Poker Royale. GSN has since returned its focus exclusively to game shows, and they reverted their on air branding to Game Show Network, so it is unlikely that reruns or a new series of Poker Royale will air on the network in the foreseeable future.
