= No Limit (2006 film) =

- Film poster
- Directed by: Brian O'Hare; Timothy Rhys
- Written by: Timothy Rhys
- Produced by: Susan Genard
- Cinematography: Ben Bloodwell; Mark Petersen
- Edited by: Ronen Pestes
- Music by: Buddy Judge
- Release date: July 27, 2006
- Country: United States
- Language: English

No Limit: A Search for the American Dream on the Poker Tournament Trail is a 2006 documentary film about the professional poker tournament circuit. The film follows producer Susan Genard as she enters several Seven-Card Stud Hi/Lo and Omaha poker tournaments across the country. Dozens of professional poker players appear in the film. No Limit features interviews with over 40 of the top players in the world. No Limit had its premiere screening at The Palms Hotel and Casino on July 27, 2006, and toured the film festival circuit. The film was released on DVD in October 2006. Interview subjects include:

- Amir Vahedi
- Annie Duke
- Barry Greenstein
- Bobby Baldwin (CEO, Mirage Resorts, Las Vegas)
- Chip Jett
- Chris "Jesus" Ferguson
- Chris Moneymaker
- Clonie Gowen
- Daniel Negreanu
- Dave "Devilfish" Ulliott
- David Sklansky
- Doyle Brunson
- Evelyn Ng
- Hendon Mob
- Howard Lederer
- James McManus
- Jennifer Harman
- Kathy Liebert
- Kenna James
- Larry Flynt
- Layne Flack
- Linda Johnson
- Mark Seif
- Mel Judah
- Men "the Master" Nguyen
- "Miami" John Cernuto
- Mike Sexton
- Paul Phillips
- Phil Gordon
- Phil Hellmuth
- Puggy Pearson
- Ron Rose
- Scotty Nguyen
- T. J. Cloutier
- Thor Hansen
- Tom McEvoy
- Vince Burgio
- Yosh Nakano
