= Ultimate Poker Challenge =

Series of poker tournaments

The Ultimate Poker Challenge (UPC) was a series of weekly poker tournaments acting as super-satellites into the series semi-finals.

The first and second seasons are available on NTSC DVD. In the United States, it was a syndicated program.

== Format ==
Players are entitled to enter multiple super-satellite tournaments (entry into the semi-finals is transferable.)

Players can also qualify for the semi-finals based on the points leaderboard for their finishing position in each event. In the first season, "Silent" Steve Simmons placed highest on the points leaderboard and received $40,000. The second place finisher received $20,000.

Beginning with season 4, the show was renamed Ultimate Poker Challenge Presents Cash Poker: The Ultimate Gamble. The format changed from weekly tournaments to following the action at cash games.

== Crew ==
Each tournament was commentated by Chad Brown, with Brandi Williams performing interviews along with intros and outros to commercial breaks. Daniel Negreanu provided cover for Chad Brown in episodes 19 and 20. Each tournament featured a professional poker player as a guest commentator, who would offer poker tips for the home viewer along with their commentary.

Beginning with season 4, Brian Mollica took over commentating duties with Williams continuing in her role as interviewer. Brown is frequently featured in the game.

The on-camera Poker Tournament Director starting in Season 2 was Brad Thomte.

Executive producer Dan Pugliese played in several tournaments throughout the series.

== Results ==
=== Season 1 ===
Week	Guest Presenter	Winner	Prize	Runner-Up	Other Finalists
1	Chris Ferguson	Nick Bouyea	$10,000	Phillip Matthews	Eli Balas; Jeff Stoff; Jess Kaufman; Gavin Smith; James Van Alstyne
2	Chris Hinchcliffe	Erik Seidel	$8,000	"Silent" Steve Simmons	Michael Ross; Brian Nadell; Renee Wexler; Ken James; Mike Turner
3	Rob Huxley	Andy Bloch	$13,500	Cong Tran	Dan Pugliese; Erik Seidel; Nick Bouyea; Mel Judah
4	Jennifer Harman	James Van Alstyne	$12,600	Todd Brunson	Allyn Jaffrey Shulman; Jimmy Ngoc Tran; Ron Blenski; Maureen Feduniak; Max Pescatori
5	Kyle Morris	Ken James	$12,640	Dan Alspach	Chris Ferguson; Robert Tolliver; Mel Judah; Thor Hansen; Chris Hinchcliffe
6	Mike Matusow	Kathy Liebert	$11,500	Don Barton	Eric Nickelson; Chad Layne; Rick Russell; Jimmy Ngoc Tran; Gary Beck
7	Robert Williamson III	David Luttbeg	$8,000	Matt Dean	Daniel McGrew; Tim Waterhouse; Renee Wexler; Cong Tran; Dan Pugliese
8	Clonie Gowen	Steve Simmons	$13,400	Kristy Gazes	Max Pescatori; Andy Bloch; Nick Bouyea; Eli Balas; Evelyn Ng
9	Renee Wexler	Kenna James	$8,400	Tony Toscano	David "C-4" Plastik; Gerry Drehobl; Todd Brunson; Amir Vahedi; No seventh place finisher
10	Daniel Negreanu	Joe Toth	$6,800	Tony Kassab	Chad Layne; Max Pescatori; Paul V Carroll; Howard "Tahoe" Andrew; Kal Stiles
11	Brandi Williams	Recap Show	N/A	N/A	N/A
12	Mark Tenner	Chris Hinchcliffe	$8,000	Max Pescatori	Matt Russell; Ned Shabou; Rick Russell; Evelyn Ng; Larry "Sig" Sigety
13	Antonio Esfandiari	Vandy Krouch	$8,200	Dr Andy Robins	Kenna James; Kenny Wagner; Clarence Moore; Eric Nickelson; Ken James
14	Phil Laak	Champie Douglas	$8,000	Ned Shabou	Jason Buckley; Max Pescatori; Pete Ostrowski; Nikki Harris; Michael Abdoulah
15	Kenna James	Pete Lawson	$8,000	David Plastik	Rich Lister; Howard Andrew; Connie Kim; Renee Wexler; Rick Russell
16	Russ Hamilton	Robert Keith Young	$4,400	Nick Bouyea	Max Pescatori; Kenna James; Tom "John" Ralis; Howard Andrew; Chris Hinchcliffe
17	Phil Hellmuth	Kris Crudup	$6,000	Avi Freedman	Renee Wexler; Tom Robinson; Dan Pugliese; Terry Nachtergaele; Steve Simmons
18	Amir Vahedi	John Cernuto	$6,800	Scott Epstein	Dan Pugliese; Nick Bouyea; Howard Andrew; Rich Lister; Kenny Robins
19	Matt Savage	Kenna James	$9,000	Karina Jett	Paul Magriel; Greg Moran; Larry Sigety; Chris Ferguson; Julie Liebel
20	Evelyn Ng	Robert Bright	$7,400	Shawn Rice	Larry Sigety; Steve Simmons; Warren Briscoe; Kenny Robbins; Max Pescatori
21	Daniel Negreanu	Jeff Shulman	$8,400	Jim Meehan	Max Pescatori; Howard Andrew; Dan Hart; Andy Bloch; Eon Marshall
22	Paul Phillips	Dennis "Mickey" Seagle	$8,000	Steve Simmons	Bob Stupak; Shawn Rice; Dan Pugliese; Bon Phan; Jeff Rine
23	Robert Williamson III	Joe Awada	$7,400	John Phan	Nick Bouyea; Barry Greenstein; Scotty Nguyen; Daniel Thomas; James Matthews
Semi-Final Pt. 1	Daniel Negreanu	(leads to Semi-Final 2)	N/A	N/A	N/A
Semi-Final Pt. 2	Daniel Negreanu	(leads to Grand Final)	N/A	N/A	N/A
Grand Final	Doyle Brunson; Todd Brunson	James Van Alstyne	$100,000	Jeff Stoff	Jim Meehan; Jeff Shulman; David Plastik; Chip Lightman; Scotty Nguyen

=== Season 2 ===
Week	Winner	Prize	Number of players	Buy In	Prize Pool	Runner-Up	Other Finalists
1	Vince Burgio	$41,020	61	$2,000	$118,340	George Bartlett	Luis Santori; Dwayne Vetter; David Levi; Stephen Huang; Petar Ivancevic
2	Rafe Furst	$35,650	70	$1,500	$101,850	Santiago Terrazas	Richard Brodie; Mike Cordell; Keith Cordell; John Murphy; Darren Brandes
3	Ronnie Ebanks	$51,410	53	$2,500	$128,525	Dan Pugliese	Kevin Chan; Jae Yun; Ken Jacobs; Joe Bartholdi Jr; Andy Bloch
4	Bill Edler	$61,110	60	$3,000	$174,600	Todd Brunson	David Daseke; Don Mullis; V S Senthil Kumar; Kassem "Freddy" Deeb; Al Krux
5 & 6	Roy Obriecht	$21,140	146	$500	$70,810	Ben Hutton	John Pesch; Brad Varnell; Kyle Tupp; Michael Souza; Phil Humphries
7	Rukhsana Guevarra	$28,235	194	$500	$94,090	Ali Lari	Irving Overman; Kenny Robbins; Dan Johnson; Dan Kaufman; Chung Ng
8	Tom Cope	$45,740	139	$1,000	$134,830	Sandy Blecker	Ronnie Bardah; Bob Kirkeby; Raul Paez; Ryan Welty; David Brooks
9	Vince Burgio	$24,055	31	$2,000	$60,140	V S Senthil Kumar	Hymie Dahar; Jane Gamble; Edward "Bolivia" Moncada; Kenny Robbins; Clonie Gowen
10 & 11	Bon Phan	$21,680	149	$500	$72,265	Howard Andrew	Erika Obst; Rick Fuller; Jeff Blenkarn; Andre De Montesquiou; Dan Johnson
12	Gary Do	$24,445	42	$1,500	$61,110	Matt Sterling	Anders Berg; Renee Wexler; David Singer; Kevin Ratliff; Allen Kessler
13 & 14	Ryan Larsen	$32,980	100	$1,000	$97,000	Derek Harrington	Simon Hennessey; David Rheem; Chris Tsiprailidis; Richard Brodie; Phillip Penn
15	Bill Edler	$32,010	33	$2,500	$80,025	Richard Brodie	Jesse Martin; Cliff Pappas; Gavin Smith; Sean McCabe; Kevin Chan
16	Joe Bartholdi Jr	$27,160	35	$2,000	$67,900	Don Mullis	Kristy Gazes; Dan Pugliese; Al Ciaglia; James English; James Hofheinz
17 & 18	Michael Mizrachi	$41,905	36	$3,000	$104,765	Kathy Liebert	Rick Fuller; Mike Wood; T. J. Cloutier; Scott Fischman; David Singer
19 & 20	Allen Cunningham	$34,920	30	$3,000	$87,300	Gavin Smith	John Roveto; Kevin Chan; Sean McCabe; David Singer; Tony Malcein
21, 22 & 23 Grand Final	Andy Bloch	$167,500	55	$10,000	$541,750	Blair Rodman	Chau Giang; Mike Wattel; V S Senthil Kumar; Scott Fischman; Ted Forrest
24	Bon Phan	$47,000	24	$5,000	$117,600	Herbert Montalbano	Allen Kessler; Phillipe Rouas; "Pistol" Pete Lawson; Joseph Saunders; Chris Gilvone

=== Season 3 ===
Week	Winner	Prize	Runner-Up	Other Finalists
1	John K Robertson	$9,470	Max Grottschneider	Chris Par; Gus Ruelas; Ted Melikian; Stan Schrier; Brian Faires
2	Brian Riley	$7,385	Brian Faires	Dan Reitberg; Johnny Scott; Steven Ellwood; Pete Kaufman; Edward Teems
3	David Brooks	$7,855	Rami Owera	Bruce Gallion; Don Lambertus; Isaac Do; Tex Bronson; Jae Chun
4	Michael Gambony	$12,050	Cal Dykes	Jim Olsen; Todd Peterson; Carl White; Warren Karp; Timothy Belstner
5	Paul Buntin	$10,365	Roxci Rhodes	Dale Tarbet; Dan Pugliese; Chris Williamson; Marikiyo Adachi; Rory McHugh
6	Ed Tonai	$6,015	Rick Troendly	Mark Casipong; Rory McHugh; Scott Coffee; Chris Truppi; Marty Wong
7	Rick Fuller	$10,670	Ken Wa	Craig Gray; Jim Lea; Jenny Kang; Michael "Shoes" Gambony; David Levi
8	Stacey Guenther	$6,180	Mike Giordano	Tam Ho; Douglas Carli; Ric Tuholsky; Chris Mankameyer; Jenny Kang
9	Ted McNeely	$12,950	James Carroll	Ut Nguyen; Men Nguyen; Becky Makar; Douglas Carli; Michael Miner
10	Craig Gray	$29,255	Kris Crudup	Nathaniel Parks; Neil Wright; Mike Laing; Kevin Jessie; Al Ethier
11	Patrick Fee	$21,040	Matthew Lesage	Rory Monahan; Mike Bond; Stan Jablonski; Tristam Coffin; Max Pescatori
12	Christy Combs	$5,790	Ted McNeely	Eric Crain; Steffen Kurz
Grand Final	Amir Vahedi	$181,390	Chip Jett	William Edler; Douglas Carli; Luke Neely; Blair Rodman; Tom Koral
Additional Event	Dan Pugliese	$5,780	Becky Makar	Jack Jobe; Allen Kessler
