= World Poker Tour season 4 results =

Below are the results of season 4 of the World Poker Tour television series (2005–2006).

== Results ==
=== Mirage Poker Showdown ===
- Casino: The Mirage, Paradise, Nevada
- Buy-in: $10,000
- 4-Day Event: May 23, 2005 to May 26, 2005
- Number of Entries: 317
- Total Prize Pool: $3,074,900
- Number of Payouts: 27
- Winning Hand: Q♦ Q♣

Final Table
Place	Name	Prize
1st	Gavin Smith	$1,153,778
2nd	Ted Forrest	$579,386
3rd	Chris Bell	$289,693
4th	Kido Pham	$182,964
5th	Eugene Todd	$137,223
6th	Mark Ellerbe	$106,729

=== Grand Prix de Paris ===
- Casino: Aviation Club de France, Paris
- Buy-in: €10,000
- 5-Day Event: July 25, 2005 to July 29, 2005
- Number of Entries: 160
- Total Prize Pool: €1,520,000
- Number of Payouts: 18
- Winning Hand: A♥ 8♣

Final Table
Place	Name	Prize
1st	Roland De Wolfe	€479,680 ($574,419)
2nd	Juha Helppi	€254,830 ($305,160)
3rd	Michel Zajdenberg	€179,880 ($215,407)
4th	Tim Anders	€119,920 ($143,605)
5th	Curt Kohlberg	€89,940 ($107,704)
6th	Alan Goehring	€74,950 ($89,753)

=== Legends of Poker ===
- Casino: Bicycle Casino, Los Angeles
- Buy-in: $5,000
- 5-Day Event: August 27, 2005 to August 31, 2005
- Number of Entries: 839
- Total Prize Pool: $4,195,000
- Number of Payouts: 72
- Winning Hand: K♥ J♣

Final Table
Place	Name	Prize
1st	Alex Kahaner	$1,150,900
2nd	Kenna James	$588,210
3rd	Jake Minter	$333,600
4th	Tim Phan	$291,900
5th	Todd Phillips	$250,200
6th	Kevin O'Donnell	$208,500

=== Borgata Poker Open ===
- Casino: Borgata, Atlantic City
- Buy-in: $10,000
- 4-Day Event: September 19, 2005 to September 22, 2005
- Number of Entries: 515
- Total Prize Pool: $4,995,500
- Number of Payouts: 45
- Winning Hand: A♥ 9♣

Final Table
Place	Name	Prize
1st	Al Ardebili	$1,498,650
2nd	Ricardo Festejo	$799,280
3rd	Kathy Liebert	$427,115
4th	John D'Agostino	$349,685
5th	Robert Hwang	$299,730
6th	David Singer	$249,775

=== UltimateBet Aruba Poker Classic ===
- Casino: Radisson Aruba Resort & Casino, Palm Beach, Aruba
- Buy-in: $5,000
- 6-Day Event: September 26, 2005 to October 1, 2005
- Number of Entries: 647
- Total Prize Pool: $3,235,000
- Number of Payouts: 125
- Winning Hand: J♦ 3♦

Final Table
Place	Name	Prize
1st	Freddy Deeb	$1,000,000
2nd	Josh Schlein	$440,450
3rd	Johan Storåkers	$300,000
4th	Devin Porter	$200,000
5th	Robert Border	$150,000
6th	Stacy Matuson	$100,000

=== Doyle Brunson North American Poker Championship ===
- Casino: Bellagio, Las Vegas
- Buy-in: $10,000
- 4-Day Event: October 18, 2005 to October 21, 2005
- Number of Entries: 420
- Total Prize Pool: $4,074,000
- Number of Payouts: 100
- Winning Hand: J♣ 3♥

Final Table
Place	Name	Prize
1st	Minh Ly	$1,060,050
2nd	Dan Harrington	$620,730
3rd	Gavin Smith	$327,610
4th	Don Zewin	$189,630
5th	Jan Sorensen	$137,940
6th	Tony Grand	$96,560

=== World Poker Finals ===
- Casino: Foxwoods, Mashantucket, Connecticut
- Buy-in: $10,000
- 5-Day Event: November 13, 2005 to November 18, 2005
- Number of Entries: 783
- Total Prize Pool: $7,855,000
- Number of Payouts: 120
- Winning Hand: 9♠ 6♠

Final Table
Place	Name	Prize
1st	Nick Schulman	$2,167,500
2nd	Anthony Licastro	$1,035,000
3rd	Bill Gazes	$759,000
4th	Allen Cunningham	$483,000
5th	Lyle Berman	$345,000
6th	Leonard Cortellino	$276,000

=== Five Diamond World Poker Classic ===
- Casino: Bellagio, Las Vegas
- Buy-in: $15,000
- 5-Day Event: December 12, 2005 to December 16, 2005
- Number of Entries: 555
- Total Prize Pool: $8,075,250
- Number of Payouts: 100
- Winning Hand: 8♣ 8♠

Final Table
Place	Name	Prize
1st	Rehne Pedersen	$2,078,185
2nd	Patrik Antonius	$1,046,470
3rd	Doyle Brunson	$563,485
4th	J.J. Liu	$362,140
5th	Darrell Dicken	$241,495
6th	Phil Laak	$160,995

=== PokerStars Caribbean Poker Adventure ===
- Casino: Atlantis, Paradise Island
- Buy-in: $7,800
- 5-Day Event: January 5, 2006 to January 10, 2006
- Number of Entries: 724
- Total Prize Pool: $5,477,700
- Number of Payouts: 130
- Winning Hand: Q♠ 10♣

Final Table
Place	Name	Prize
1st	Steve Paul-Ambrose	$1,388,600
2nd	Brook Lyter	$681,500
3rd	David Singer	$436,200
4th	Michael Higgins	$327,100
5th	Anders Henriksson	$239,900
6th	Ozzy Sheikh	$177,200

=== Gold Strike World Poker Open ===
- Casino: Gold Strike Tunica
- Buy-in: $10,000
- 5-Day Event: January 19, 2006 to January 23, 2006
- Number of Entries: 327
- Total Prize Pool: $3,171,900
- Number of Payouts: 50
- Winning Hand: A♠ Q♠

Final Table
Place	Name	Prize
1st	Scotty Nguyen	$969,421
2nd	Michael Mizrachi	$566,352
3rd	Raul Paez	$298,908
4th	Gavin Smith	$173,052
5th	An Tran	$125,856
6th	Bau Le	$88,099

=== Borgata Winter Poker Open ===
- Casino: Borgata, Atlantic City
- Buy-in: $10,000
- 4-Day Event: January 29, 2006 to February 1, 2006
- Number of Entries: 381
- Total Prize Pool: $3,695,700
- Number of Payouts: 75
- Winning Hand: J♥ 6♣

Final Table
Place	Name	Prize
1st	Michael Mizrachi	$1,173,373
2nd	John D'Agostino	$591,312
3rd	Erick Lindgren	$282,721
4th	Amnon Filippi	$184,785
5th	Josh Spiegelman	$147,828
6th	Stuart Paterson	$110,871

=== L.A. Poker Classic ===
- Casino: Commerce Casino, Los Angeles
- Buy-in: $10,000
- 6-Day Event: February 16, 2006 to February 21, 2006
- Number of Entries: 692
- Total Prize Pool: $6,643,200
- Number of Payouts: 45
- Winning Hand: K♦ 8♥

Final Table
Place	Name	Prize
1st	Alan Goehring	$2,391,550
2nd	Daniel Quach	$1,162,560
3rd	Michael Woo	$571,315
4th	Steve Simmons	$338,803
5th	J.C. Tran	$265,728
6th	Per Ummer	$199,296

=== WPT Celebrity Invitational ===
- Casino: Commerce Casino, Los Angeles
- Buy-in:
- 2-Day Event: February 22, 2006
- Number of Entries: 315
- Total Prize Pool:
- Number of Payouts:
- Winning Hand: A♦ K♣

Final Table
Place	Name	Prize
1st	Barry Greenstein	$100,000
2nd	Blair Rodman	$50,000
3rd	Allen Kessler	$20,000
4th	Jesse Jones	$15,000
5th	Tom Lock	$10,000
6th	Ugur Marangoz	$5,000

=== Bay 101 Shooting Star ===
- Casino: Bay 101, San Jose, California
- Buy-in: $10,000
- 5-Day Event: February 27, 2006 to March 3, 2006
- Number of Entries: 518
- Total Prize Pool: $4,702,800
- Number of Payouts: 45
- Winning Hand: A♣ 7♣

Final Table
Place	Name	Prize
1st	Nam Le	$1,198,300
2nd	Ravi Udayakumar	$629,500
3rd	Danny Smith	$340,000
4th	David Williams	$280,000
5th	Fabrice Soulier	$240,000
6th	Chad Brown	$200,000

=== World Poker Challenge ===
- Casino: Reno Hilton, Reno
- Buy-in: $5,000
- 4-Day Event: March 27, 2006 to March 30, 2006
- Number of Entries: 592
- Total Prize Pool: $2,845,700
- Number of Payouts: 36
- Winning Hand: K♥ 4♣

Final Table
Place	Name	Prize
1st	Mike Simon	$1,052,890
2nd	Jason Stern	$529,300
3rd	Tom Schneider	$256,115
4th	Greg Mueller	$142,285
5th	Jonas Norrman	$113,830
6th	Barry Greenstein	$85,370

=== Foxwoods Poker Classic ===
- Casino: Foxwoods, Mashantucket
- Buy-in: $10,000
- 4-Day Event: April 6, 2006 to April 9, 2006
- Number of Entries: 431
- Total Prize Pool: $4,175,200
- Number of Payouts: 40
- Winning Hand: A♥ J♠

Final Table
Place	Name	Prize
1st	Victor Ramdin	$1,331,889
2nd	Alex Jacob	$655,507
3rd	Edward Jordan	$417,520
4th	Larry Klur	$292,264
5th	John Russell	$208,760
6th	Bruce Kater	$167,008

=== WPT Championship ===
- Casino: Bellagio, Las Vegas
- Buy-in: $25,000
- 7-Day Event: April 18, 2006 to April 24, 2006
- Number of Entries: 605
- Total Prize Pool: $14,671,250
- Number of Payouts: 100
- Winning Hand: 9♦ 5♥

Final Table
Place	Name	Prize
1st	Joe Bartholdi	$3,760,165
2nd	Davidson Matthew	$1,903,950
3rd	Roland De Wolfe	$1,025,205
4th	Claus Nielson	$659,120
5th	James Van Alstyne	$439,357
6th	Men Nguyen	$292,915

== Other Events ==
During season 4 of the WPT there was one special event that did not apply to the Player of the Year standings:

- The WPT Celebrity Invitational - February 22–24, 2006 - Commerce Casino - postscript to Event #12: L.A. Poker Classic - won by Barry Greenstein
