= Lucky You (film) =

- Theatrical release poster
- Directed by: Curtis Hanson
- Screenplay by: Eric Roth; Curtis Hanson
- Story by: Eric Roth
- Produced by: Denise Di Novi; Curtis Hanson; Carol Fenelon
- Starring: Eric Bana; Drew Barrymore; Robert Duvall; Debra Messing
- Cinematography: Peter Deming
- Edited by: Craig Kitson; William Kerr
- Music by: Christopher Young
- Production companies: Village Roadshow Pictures; Flower Films; Di Novi Pictures; Deuce Three Productions
- Distributed by: Warner Bros. Pictures
- Release date: May 4, 2007
- Running time: 124 minutes
- Country: United States
- Language: English
- Budget: $55 million
- Box office: $8.4 million

Lucky You is a 2007 American drama film that was directed by Curtis Hanson. It stars Eric Bana, Drew Barrymore and Robert Duvall. The film was shot on location in Las Vegas. The screenplay was by Hanson and Eric Roth, but the film was partially inspired by George Stevens' 1970 film The Only Game in Town.

== Plot ==
In 2003, Huck Cheever is a young and talented poker player in Las Vegas haunted by his relationship with his estranged father, L.C. Cheever, a two-time World Series of Poker Champion. Huck is a regular in Vegas poker rooms but needs $10,000 to get a seat in the World Series of Poker Main Event.

After a good night at the Bellagio hotel's poker room, Huck goes to a party and meets aspiring singer Billie Offer, who has just arrived in town. Billie's older sister Suzanne warns her that Huck is "hustle 10, commitment zero." Back at the Bellagio, Huck is doing well at the tables before L.C. returns to town from the South of France. Huck greets his father coldly. The two play heads-up.

Loan shark Roy Durucher tells Huck that he plays poker as well as anybody, except for his reputation as a "blaster" (not patient enough) who always goes for broke. Roy proposes to stake Huck in the $10,000 main event with a 60% (Roy) — 40% (Huck) split of any winnings, but Huck refuses. After failing to borrow money from his friend Jack, Huck goes to Suzanne's place hoping for a loan. Instead, he runs into Billie, who gets a call confirming that she has landed a job singing at a club.

Huck proposes a celebration and at Binion's Horseshoe he shows her how to play poker. L.C. arrives and shows Huck a wedding ring of Huck's late mother's that Huck had pawned and that L.C. has redeemed. Huck loses his winnings. Over dinner, he explains to Billie that his father stole from his mother before leaving her. Huck says his father taught him how to play on the kitchen table with "pennies, nickels, and dimes." They make love after dinner. As Billie sleeps, Huck steals money from Billie's purse.

Huck plays in a "super satellite" to enter the main event. He appears to have the seat won, but a misdeal costs him. Roy agrees to stake Huck and even gives him an extra $1200 so that he can repay Billie. He apologizes to her, saying he feels they have a chance at something special. They later run into L.C., who wins all of Huck's stake money for the World Series in a quick game of guts.

Billie holds the stopwatch in a golfing marathon that Huck must complete in 3 hours to win a bet. She declines to cheat for him when he finishes two seconds too late. Huck gets a black eye when Roy's thugs toss him into his empty pool. They warn him to return the $11,200 stake that he owes to Roy or get a seat in the World Series within 48 hours. When Huck goes to Suzanne's apartment looking for Billie, he learns Billie has gone home to Bakersfield. Huck sells the wedding ring to his father for $500 and makes the 10 grand playing poker in one night to buy a seat in the World Series. Huck travels to Bakersfield to tell Billie that he meant what he said when he felt they had a chance at something special.

Back in Vegas, having found the entry money, Huck enters the World Series. He and his father both advance to the final table of nine. Billie looks on from the audience as Huck and L.C. have a showdown. Huck deliberately folds a winning hand, going out in third place. A few minutes later, L.C. gets rivered and goes out in second place, losing the title to Jason Keyes who had "won his entry in an online satellite" (a nod to Chris Moneymaker, who did win the 2003 Main Event after a similar entry to the tournament).

After the tournament, L.C. offers his son a one-on-one rematch, playing only for pennies, nickels, and dimes. Their relationship is restored, as is Huck's and Billie's in the final scene.

== Cast ==
- Eric Bana as Huck Cheever
- Drew Barrymore as Billie Offer
- Robert Duvall as L.C. Cheever
- Debra Messing as Suzanne Offer
- Horatio Sanz as Ready Eddie
- Charles Martin Smith as Roy Durucher
- Danny Hoch as Bobby Basketball
- Saverio Guerra as Lester
- Robert Downey Jr. as Telephone Jack
- Jean Smart as Michelle Carson
- Kelvin Han Yee as Chico Bahn
- Michael Shannon as Ray
- Evan Jones as Jason Keyes
- Phyllis Somerville as Pawnbroker
- Bill McKinney as Satellite Cashier
- Joey Kern as Billie's Admirer
- Mykel Shannon Jenkins as Gary
- Omar Benson Miller as Card Grabber
- Francine Beers as Elderly Female Player
- Mark Tymchyshyn as Tournament Official
- Bradford English as Tommy the Poker Host
- Olivia Tracey as Isabel
- Michelle Borth as Girlfriend of Josh Cohen

== Poker players ==
Many of the players seen are actual poker pros. They include:

- Hasan Habib
- Sam Farha
- Chau Giang
- Barry Greenstein
- Jason Lester
- Ted Forrest
- Minh Ly
- John Murphy
- Erick Lindgren
- Daniel Negreanu
- Doyle Brunson
- Johnny Chan
- Hoyt Corkins
- Antonio Esfandiari
- Chris Ferguson
- Dan Harrington
- Phil Hellmuth
- Karina Jett
- John Juanda
- Mike Matusow
- Erik Seidel
- Mimi Tran
- Marsha Waggoner
- Robert Williamson III
- Cyndy Violette
- Pat Callihan

Three others featured in the film play fictional characters. They are:

- Jennifer Harman as Shannon Kincaid
- John Hennigan as Ralph Kaczynski
- David Oppenheim as Josh Cohen

World Series of Poker

- Host Jack Binion
- Tournament Director Matt Savage

== Production ==
Director Curtis Hanson developed the film with his producing partner Carol Fenelon, who was a regular competitor in poker tournaments. Hanson said, "Part of the reason for wanting to make the movie was that the poker world was different, interesting, and we had an affinity for it. But the other part of it was the emotional thing. The skills at the table — and in the movie business — are different from the qualities that you want running your personal life. That single-mindedness, the aggression, the duplicity or bluffing or whatever you want to call it, the lack of sympathy — as [Billie] says."

Eric Bana was cast in the lead role in September 2004. Drew Barrymore was cast in January 2005, and Debra Messing was cast that February. Doyle Brunson served as a poker consultant on the film. Eric Bana and Robert Duvall were coached for months by Brunson on how to play like professional poker players. Matt Savage served as a tournament consultant, while Jason Lester served as a consultant on scenes involving the Main Event championship.

Principal photography began on March 28, 2005, in Las Vegas, Nevada, where a majority of filming took place. Filming took place over nine days in the parking lot of Dino's Lounge on South Las Vegas Boulevard. A set was built on a soundstage in Los Angeles, California, which was used for interior scenes of the bar. Other filming locations in Las Vegas included the fountains of the Bellagio resort, Binion's Gambling Hall and Hotel, and the Jockey Club timeshare on the Las Vegas Strip.

In April 2005, scenes were filmed at Summerlin's Bear's Best Golf Club, and at Tiffany's Cafe inside the White Cross Drugs store. Later that month, filming took place at the Silverton Casino Lodge's 117,000-gallon aquatic tank, where Debra Messing spent 16 hours filming a scene dressed as a mermaid in the casino's mermaid show. The scene was cut from the film. Filming also took place at the Cosmopolitan resort, which was under construction at the time. In early May 2005, filming took place at a Summerlin condominium complex and then resumed at the White Cross drugstore. Filming was scheduled to conclude in Las Vegas on May 5, 2005, and then continue in California for a few months.

The filmmakers wanted to film at the Bellagio's poker room, but it had been renovated since 2003, the year that the film's story took place. Instead, an exact replica of the original poker room was constructed on a soundstage in Los Angeles. At the time, the Bellagio was auctioning items from the old poker room, including furniture and chandeliers, all of which were purchased by the production crew to help recreate the original poker room. A replica of a multi-purpose gambling room from Binion's Gambling Hall was also created in Los Angeles.

== Music ==
The soundtrack to the film Lucky You was released by Columbia Records on April 24, 2007, on audio CD and audio cassette.

No.	Title	Artist	Length
1.	"Lucky Town"	Bruce Springsteen	3:27
2.	"Dance Me to the End of Love"	Leonard Cohen performed by Madeleine Peyroux	3:56
3.	"Choices"	George Jones	3:26
4.	"Maybe This Time"	Liza Minnelli	3:30
5.	"The Fever"	Bruce Springsteen	7:36
6.	"Bartender's Blues"	Bonnie Raitt	4:26
7.	"They Ain't Got 'Em All"	Kris Kristofferson	2:54
8.	"The Cold Hard Truth (duet with Colbie Caillat)"	Drew Barrymore	4:26
9.	"Like a Rolling Stone"	Bob Dylan	6:10
10.	"Let It Ride"	Ryan Adams	3:25
11.	"I Always Get Lucky with You"	George Jones performed by Drew Barrymore	3:20
12.	"Huck's Tune*"	Bob Dylan	4:00
Total length:			50:36

"Huck's Tune" was written specifically for the film and later released on Bob Dylan's The Bootleg Series Vol. 8: Tell Tale Signs: Rare and Unreleased 1989–2006 compilation album.

== Release ==
The film was initially set for release on December 16, 2005. However, the film sat on the shelf for two years and went through numerous release date changes as Warner Bros. mandated a half-dozen different cuts of the film in response to negative test screenings. In January 2007, the film's eventual release date was unveiled to be May 4, 2007.

== Reception ==
Opening the same weekend as Spider-Man 3, the film debuted with $2.7 million in ticket sales; the lowest saturated opening week since 1982. It finished its theatrical run with $8,382,477 in total worldwide revenue.

The film was not well received by critics. It holds a 28% approval rating based on 141 reviews on Rotten Tomatoes. The site's consensus states: "Lucky You tries to combine a romantic story with the high-stakes world of poker, but comes up with an empty hand." Metacritic, which uses a weighted average, assigned the film a score of 49 out of 100, based on 29 critics, indicating "mixed or average" reviews. Audiences polled by CinemaScore gave the film an average grade of "C" on an A+ to F scale.

Much of the criticism focused on the film's pacing and poker scenes. A. O. Scott of The New York Times said, "Even though it is sometimes dull and generally thin, there is something winning about the movie’s genial lack of ambition. It’s a nickel-ante fable of lessons learned and chances taken set in the world of high-stakes competitive poker. The sense of disappointment that lingers afterward may result from inflated expectations since this is a small picture with some big names attached to it." IGN opined the relationship between Huck and Billie is unconvincing and that the film works better as a father-son drama.

Eric Bana was nominated for the Australian Film Institute International Award for Best Actor.

== See also ==
- List of films set in Las Vegas
