= Jim Meehan =

American poker player (1952–2018)

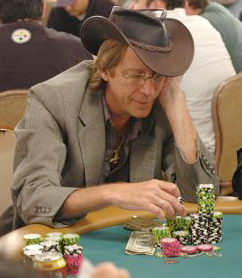
- Meehan at the 2005 World Series of Poker
- Nicknames: Minneapolis Jim, Silent Jim
- Born: March 19, 1952; Saint Paul, Minnesota, U.S.
- Died: December 6, 2018 (aged 66); Minnesota, U.S.

World Series of Poker
- Bracelet: 1
- Money finishes: 19
- Highest WSOP Main Event finish: 195th, 2005

World Poker Tour
- Title: None
- Final table: 1
- Money finish: 1

James Michael Meehan (March 19, 1952 – December 6, 2018), sometimes known as Minneapolis Jim Meehan, was an American professional poker player from Burnsville, Minnesota. Prior to his poker career, Meehan worked as a lawyer for many years.

Meehan began playing poker in the 1960s, and began playing poker tournaments regularly in 1997, when he had a second-place finish in the $3,000 limit hold'em event at the World Series of Poker (WSOP). He finished third in the $2,500 limit Omaha event at the 1999 WSOP.

He eventually won a WSOP bracelet in 2003 in the $2,000 no limit hold'em event, defeating a final table that included Juha Helppi, Antonio Esfandiari, Mike Sexton and Kathy Liebert. He won a World Championship of Online Poker bracelet that same year in the $500 Buy In Limit Holdem event, besting a field of almost 700.

Meehan made one World Poker Tour (WPT) final table, during the third season. He finished in sixth place at a final table including Eli Elezra, Lee Watkinson, Gabe Kaplan, John Juanda and Scotty Nguyen.

He also made the final table of the Ultimate Poker Challenge first season championship. Meehan entered the seven-handed TV table as the short stack but finished in third place despite being given a time penalty for foul language. He was eliminated by the eventual winner, James Van Alstyne.

Meehan often drank alcohol at the poker table, particularly Heineken beer or whiskey, and kept an unlit cigarette on his lips. He also made a habit of engaging his opponents in banter between and during hands.

He played online at PokerStars as Actiondonkey and at ParadisePoker as Actionmonkey.

His total live tournament winnings exceed $1,400,000. His 19 cashes as the WSOP account for $648,224 of those winnings.

He had three children. Meehan died on December 6, 2018, at the age of 66.
