= Feduniak =

Surname list

Feduniak is a surname. Notable people with the surname include:

- Bob Feduniak, American poker player, husband of Maureen
- Maureen Feduniak, American poker player
- Michael Feduniak (1914–1989), Canadian businessman and politician
