= Mimi Tran =

Vietnamese-American poker player (born 1960)

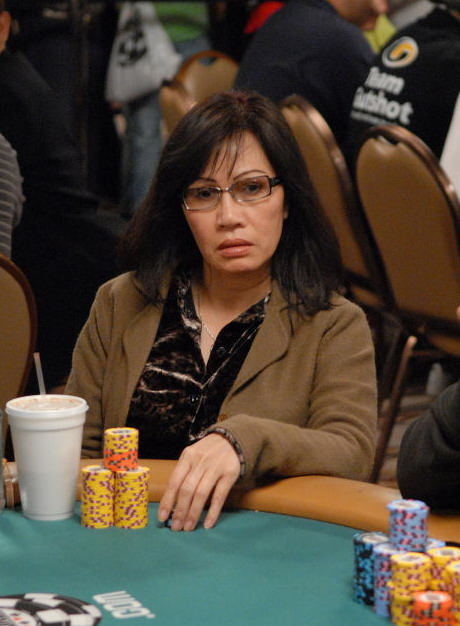
- Mimi Tran at the 2007 World Series of Poker Main Event
- Born: July 5, 1960 (age 66)

World Series of Poker
- Bracelet: None
- Money finishes: 17
- Highest WSOP Main Event finish: 317th, 2007

World Poker Tour
- Title: 0(+1)
- Final table: 1(+1)
- Money finishes: 4(+1)

Thithi "Mimi" Tran (born July 5, 1960) is a Vietnamese-American professional poker player.

== Biography ==
Tran was born in Nha Trang, Vietnam. After moving to the United States in 1982, Tran found work in the electronics industry in Silicon Valley. She began playing poker in 1989, after an auto accident left her disabled and unable to continue working in her field. Tran has finished in the money in multiple World Series of Poker (WSOP) tournaments, including two second-place finishes, a third-place finish, and a fourth-place finish. A high-stakes specialist, Tran is perhaps best known as Barry Greenstein's ex-girlfriend. Greenstein not only taught her how to play poker, but also convinced her to compete in tournaments; until the mid-to-late 1990s she had been exclusively a side-game player. (Initially, Greenstein himself also played exclusively in side-games; he used to donate his tournament winnings to charity.) In exchange for Greenstein teaching Tran how to play poker, she taught him how to speak Vietnamese. The two have an ongoing debate about who is the better teacher; Greenstein says he is the better teacher and Tran says that is only because she is the better student.

As of 2008, her total live tournament winnings exceed $1,400,000. Her 17 cashes at the WSOP account for $408,304 of those winnings. She also features highly in the list of most successful female poker players in terms of tournament earnings. Tran has two children and lives in Los Angeles, California.

At the inaugural National Heads-Up Poker Championship, Tran was the only female to make the money in a field that included Annie Duke, Jennifer Harman, Kathy Liebert, Cyndy Violette and Evelyn Ng. All three of her opponents were WSOP Main Event champions: she defeated 1983 champion Tom McEvoy and 2003 champion Chris Moneymaker before being eliminated in the semi-finals by 2000 champion Chris Ferguson. She received $25,000 prize money.
