= Kristy Gazes =

American poker player (born 1967)

- Nickname: Mixed Games
- Born: October 28, 1967 (age 59)

World Series of Poker
- Bracelet: None
- Money finishes: 8
- Highest WSOP Main Event finish: 592nd, 2009

World Poker Tour
- Title: None
- Final table: None
- Money finishes: 10

Kristy Gazes (born October 28, 1967) is a professional poker player originally from California.

== Poker career ==
Gazes made the 2001 World Series of Poker S.H.O.E. final table, finishing in fifth place for $17,555.

Her biggest career win came in 2005, when she took first place in the Full Tilt Poker Championship at the Wynn Las Vegas, besting a live televised final table that included Ted Forrest, Clonie Gowen and Daniel Negreanu. She took a $250,000 payout for her victory.

In 2003, she won the World Championship of Online Poker Omaha high low split title.

Gazes made multiple final tables during the first season of the Ultimate Poker Challenge and appeared as a guest commentator on that program. She appeared in the GSN series Poker Royale Battle of the Sexes.

In 2007, she made two final tables at the Aussie Millions, the Main Event and Pot Limit Omaha event, taking home over $230,000.

In August 2007, she won the World Poker Tour Season Six Ladies Invitational.

As of 2016, her live tournament winnings exceed $1,040,000.

Kristy was formerly married to poker pro Bill Gazes.

In recent years, she has shifted her career focus from poker to the stock market and now owns a successful options trading business.
