= Chad Brown (poker player) =

American actor and poker player (1961–2014)

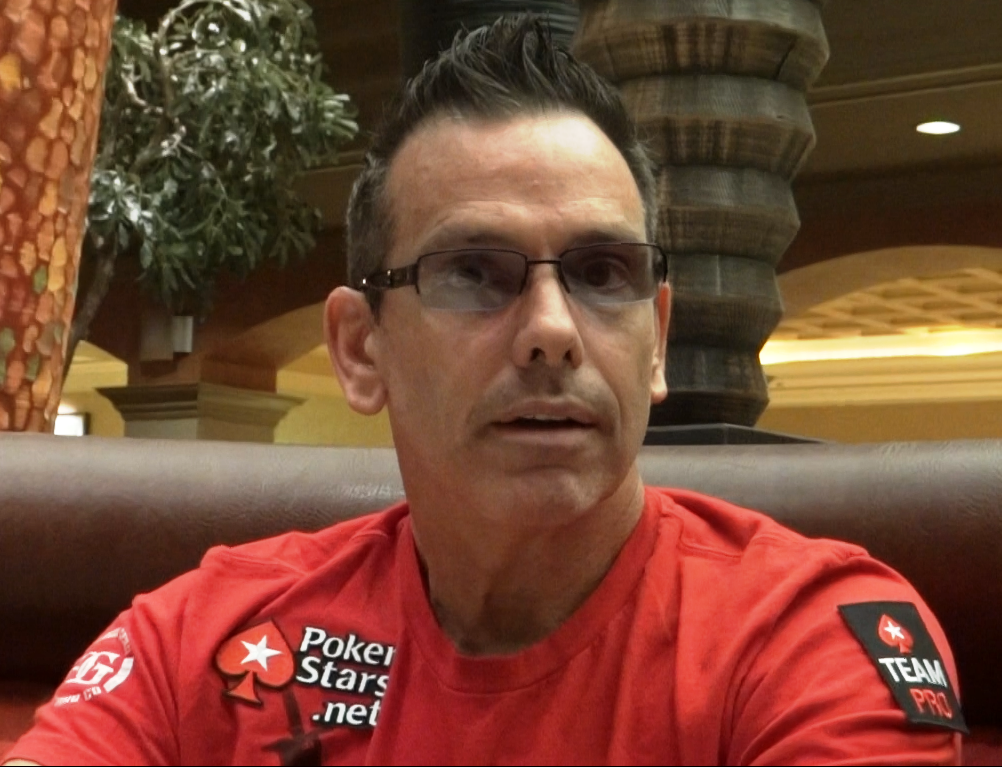
- Brown at the 2012 WSOP
- Nickname: Downtown
- Born: August 13, 1961; New York City, U.S.
- Died: July 2, 2014 (aged 52); New York City, U.S.

World Series of Poker
- Bracelet: None
- Final tables: 9
- Money finishes: 38
- Highest WSOP Main Event finish: 97th, 2007

World Poker Tour
- Title: None
- Final table: 1
- Money finishes: 10

European Poker Tour
- Title: None
- Final table: 1
- Money finishes: 4

Chad Brown (August 13, 1961 – July 2, 2014) was an American actor, poker player and color commentator, based in Los Angeles, California.

== Early life, family and education ==
Brown was born in Manhattan, New York, and was raised in The Bronx, where he began playing poker in Italian cafés.

== Career ==
He moved to Los Angeles in the early 1990s where he began working in Hollywood. Brown landed minor roles in television series and feature films, including Miami Hustle, Basket Case 2 and Maximum Bob. He also appeared as an assistant host on the game show Caesars Challenge in the early 1990s.

Brown was the presenter of the Ultimate Poker Challenge television series. He has finished in the money at several events in the World Series of Poker (WSOP), including third in the 2002 $1,500 Omaha hi-lo split event, second to Ted Forrest in the 2004 $1,500 seven-card stud event and second in the 2005 $2,000 seven-card stud hi-lo event. Brown made back to back final tables at 2005 World Series of Poker circuit events, including a third-place finish behind Chris Ferguson and Prahlad Friedman. Brown made 10 Final Tables at the WSOP, but never won a WSOP Bracelet in open competition. He finished runner-up three times and in third place three times. In 2014 he was awarded an honorary World Series of Poker bracelet for his overall contributions to the game of poker.

Brown reached the final table of the World Poker Tour fourth season Bay 101 Shooting Stars Tournament, where he finished 6th. Brown won one of the biggest online poker tournaments in the 2006 World Championship of Online Poker $5000 H.O.R.S.E. event. He bested 174 other players to take down the $223,125 first prize and a gold bracelet. Brown made the finals of the NBC National Heads-Up Poker Championship, defeating Yosh Nakano, Gabe Kaplan, Brad Booth, Kristy Gazes, and Gavin Smith before losing to Paul Wasicka 2-0 in the best-of-three final.

In 2007, Brown cashed for the first time in the Main Event, coming in 97th place out of a field of 6,358 players, winning $67,535.

Brown's biggest win came at the 2009 Gulf Coast Poker Championship at the Beau Rivage Resort & Casino in Biloxi, Mississippi. Brown and Vanessa Rousso served as the official celebrity hosts of the tournament. For first place, Brown earned $225,567.

Brown was named Bluff Magazine Poker Player of the Year for 2006, for which he said “Winning player of the year is like an actor winning an Oscar”.

Brown's total live tournament winnings exceed $3,600,000. His 38 cashes at the WSOP account for $1,220,357 of those winnings.

== Personal life and death ==
Brown resided in Los Angeles, California. In December 2007, he was engaged to Vanessa Rousso, also a professional poker player, with a wedding planned for 2009. He was twenty years her senior. However, after separating, they divorced in January 2012 but remained very close.

In February 2011, he was diagnosed with liposarcoma and had a 10 lb (5 kg) tumor removed from his abdomen. Brown resumed his poker career until he was no longer physically able to compete. He underwent radiation therapy, chemotherapy and other conventional treatments as well as alternative therapy in Mexico. Just prior to his death, the World Series of Poker honored him by awarding him an honorary bracelet for his achievements in poker, but Brown was unable to make the ceremony due to his condition, so it was shipped to him so he could see and wear it before he died.

Brown died on July 2, 2014, at age 52 in hospice care at Calvary Hospital in New York with his fiancée Stephanie Donahue by his side.
