= Stacked with Daniel Negreanu =

2006 video game

- PC cover art
- Developer: Eidos Interactive
- Publisher: Myelin Media
- Engine: Gamebryo
- Platforms: Windows, Xbox, PlayStation 2, PlayStation Portable
- Release: Windows, Xbox: NA: May 30, 2006; EU: April 20, 2007 (PC); AU: May 11, 2007 (PC); PlayStation 2: NA: May 31, 2006; EU: March 9, 2007; AU: March 16, 2007; Playstation Portable: NA: October 6, 2006; AU: February 6, 2007
- Genre: Poker

Stacked with Daniel Negreanu, also known as simply Stacked, is a poker video game released in 2006 for Windows, Xbox, PlayStation 2 and PlayStation Portable featuring the titular professional championship player Daniel Negreanu. Other pros also make an appearance, including Evelyn Ng (Negreanu's then girlfriend), Juan Carlos Mortensen, and Erick Lindgren. The game's style of poker is Texas hold'em.

The PC's online mode was hosted by MTV. The initial release for Xbox contained a serious bug that caused player data to be reset and online leaderboards not function correctly when playing on Xbox Live; a patch was available to fix these problems.

== Reception ==
The game received mixed reviews on all platforms according to the review aggregation website Metacritic. Despite the mediocre score, it was frequently noted as being one of the best poker video games released to date, with special recognition towards the game's AI.

Reception

Aggregate score
Aggregator	Score			
Aggregator	PC	PS2	PSP	Xbox
Metacritic	54/100	63/100	63/100	61/100

Review scores
Publication	Score			
Publication	PC	PS2	PSP	Xbox
GameRevolution	N/A	C	N/A	C
GameSpot	7.7/10	7.7/10	7.4/10	7.7/10
GameSpy	2.5/5	2.5/5	3.5/5	2.5/5
GameTrailers	4.6/10	4.6/10	N/A	4.6/10
GameZone	N/A	7/10	6.8/10	N/A
IGN	4.8/10	4.8/10	5/10	4.8/10
Official U.S. PlayStation Magazine	N/A	3.5/5	N/A	N/A
Official Xbox Magazine (US)	N/A	N/A	N/A	6.5/10
PC Gamer (US)	50%	N/A	N/A	N/A
X-Play	N/A	N/A	N/A	3/5
The A.V. Club	C	C	N/A	C
