= John Ahlers =

American sports announcer and game show host

John Ahlers is the television play-by-play announcer for the Anaheim Ducks of the National Hockey League on Victory+. He has also served as an announcer for Poker Royale on the Game Show Network.

A Michigan State University graduate, Ahlers early broadcasting career consisted of stints with the Michigan State Spartans and Colorado College Tigers men's hockey teams and professionally with the Salt Lake Golden Eagles and the Louisville IceHawks.

Ahlers spent five seasons as the television and radio voice of the Detroit Vipers. During that time, he also called the IHL Game of Week and Turner Cup Finals for Fox Sports Net. While with the Vipers he received the IHL Broadcaster of the Year award in 1995 and Emmys for Best Sports Broadcasts in 1995 and 1998.

In 1999, Ahlers joined the Tampa Bay Lightning where he served as the radio play-by-play voice until 2002. He also hosted the Lightning's television pre-game show and Lightning Weekly, a magazine format program aired on the Sunshine Network.

Ahlers joined the Ducks television broadcasts for the 2002–03 NHL season, partnering with longtime Ducks color commentator Brian Hayward. In 2003, he won the Emmy for Best Live Sports Broadcast during Game 4 against the Detroit Red Wings in the first round of the Stanley Cup Playoffs. He also served as an announcer for occasional NHL games on Versus.

In 2005, Ahlers became the permanent host of GSN's Poker Royale. He hosted six tournaments in the series before the show ended in December 2005. He joined Sports USA in 2012 as a college football announcer.
