= Blair Rodman =

American poker player (born 1954)

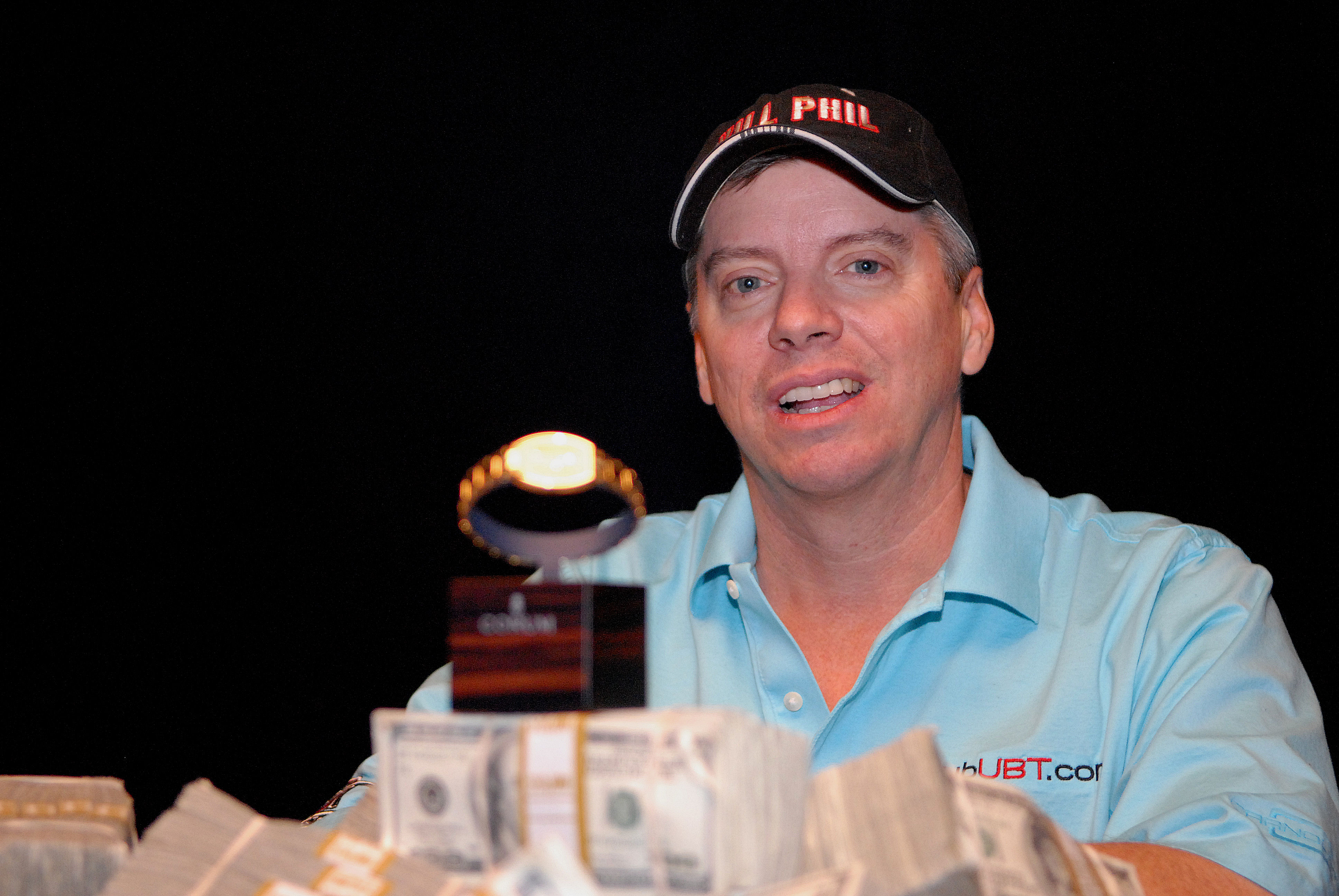
- Rodman after winning the $2,000 No Limit Hold 'Em event at the 2007 World Series of Poker
- Born: April 5, 1954 (age 72); Troy, New York, U.S.

World Series of Poker
- Bracelet: 1
- Money finishes: 47
- Highest WSOP Main Event finish: 34th, 2009

World Poker Tour
- Title: None
- Final tables: 2
- Money finishes: 2

Blair Rodman (born April 5, 1954, in Troy, New York) is an American professional poker player, based in Las Vegas, Nevada.

Rodman has been playing poker professionally since 1985, when he quit his job dealing craps. He has had numerous finishes in the money at the World Series of Poker (WSOP) in hold'em, seven-card stud, and Omaha poker tournaments. In March 2005, he made his first World Poker Tour (WPT) final table, finishing 2nd to Arnold Spee in the 2005 World Poker Challenge. In May 2005, Rodman made the final table of the Professional Poker Tour event won by Ted Forrest. He also made the final tables at the 2nd and 3rd Ultimate Poker Challenge grand finals, finishing 2nd and 6th respectively. He made a second WPT final table in February 2006, again finishing 2nd, this time to Barry Greenstein in the Pro-Celebrity Invitational event. On July 1, 2007, Rodman won his first bracelet, in the 2007 World Series of Poker $2,000 No-Limit Hold'em event, winning $707,898.

As of 2017, his total live tournament winnings exceed $2,500,000. His 60 cashes at the WSOP account for $1,768,345 of those winnings.

Rodman is the co-author, with Lee Nelson, of the book Kill Phil: The Fast Track to Success in No-Limit Hold 'em Poker Tournaments (ISBN 0-929712-24-2).
