= Layne Flack =

American poker player (1969–2021)

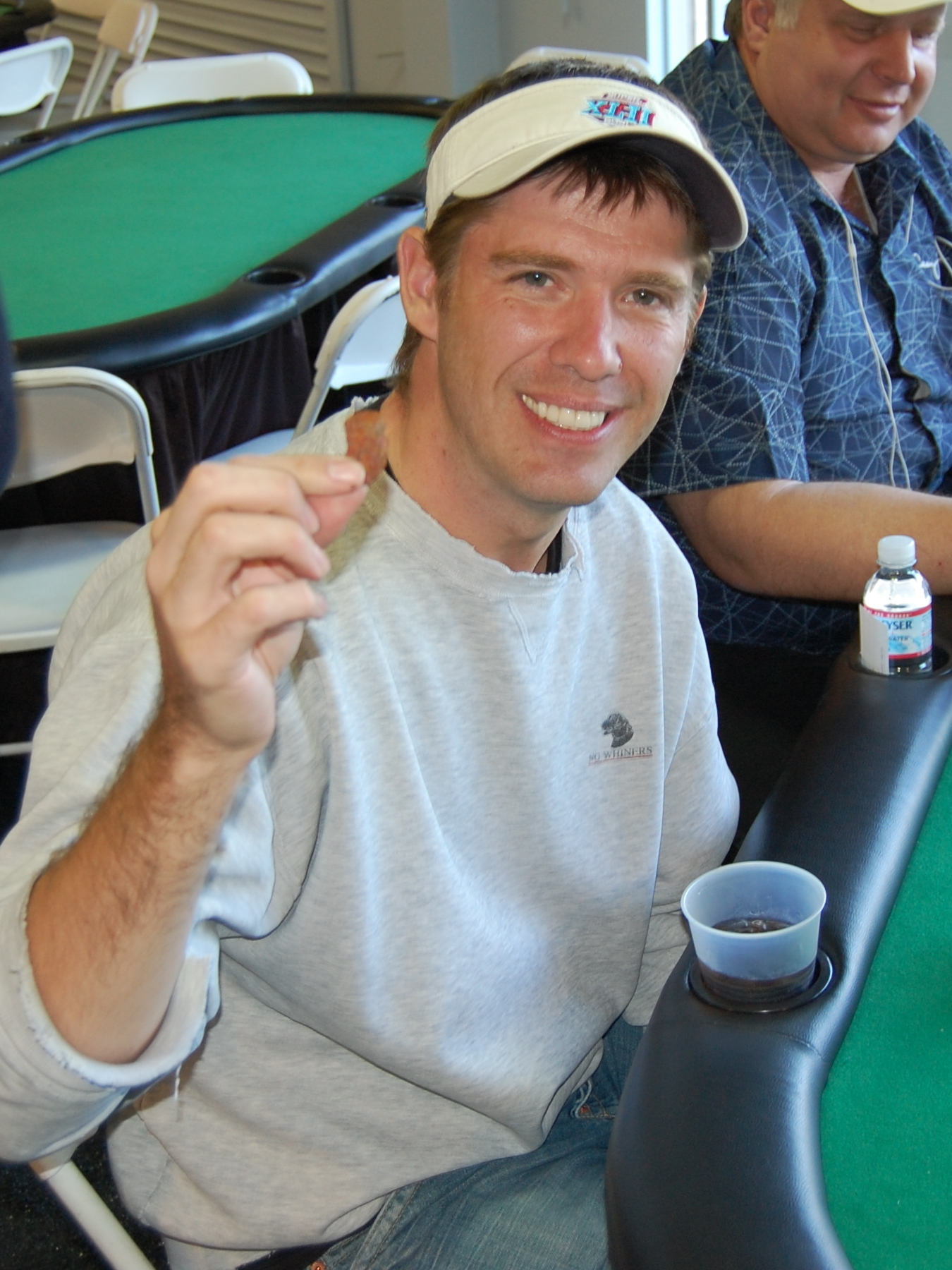
- Flack at 2008 Bay 101 Shooting Star
- Nickname: Back to Back
- Born: May 18, 1969; Rapid City, South Dakota, U.S.
- Died: July 19, 2021 (aged 52); Las Vegas, Nevada, U.S.

World Series of Poker
- Bracelets: 6
- Money finishes: 58
- Highest WSOP Main Event finish: 194th, 2005

World Poker Tour
- Title: 1
- Final tables: 3
- Money finishes: 9

Layne Flack (May 18, 1969 – July 19, 2021) was an American professional poker player from Rapid City, South Dakota, residing in Montana and Nevada.

== Poker career ==
Flack started playing cards with his grandparents, but became engrossed in the game while working at a casino. He would regularly go to another casino after work to play poker. Despite becoming the night manager in his job, he quit as he was spending too much time on poker to continue working full-time as well.

Flack met up with Johnny Chan, who helped him improve his game and, following a big loss, encouraged Flack to ensure he had a lot of rest before a tournament. Ted Forrest and Chip Jett traveled with Flack for years on the poker circuit.

Flack had lifetime live tournament play winnings of over $5,000,000. His 43 cashes at the WSOP accounted for $2,740,892 of his live tournament winnings.

=== World Series of Poker ===
Flack won six bracelets at the WSOP. He got the nickname "Back to Back Flack" after winning two consecutive Legends of Poker events in August 1999. He would accomplish the same feat three years later at the 2002 and the 2003 WSOP series.

==== World Series of Poker Bracelets ====
Year	Tournament	Prize (US$)
1999	$3,000 Pot Limit Hold-Em	$224,400
2002	$2,000 No Limit Hold-Em	$303,880
2002	$1,500 No Limit Hold-Em	$268,020
2003	$2,500 Omaha Hi-Lo Split	$119,260
2003	$1,500 Limit Hold-Em Shootout	$120,000
2008	$1,500 Pot Limit Omaha w/Rebuys	$577,725

=== World Poker Tour ===
Flack made numerous appearances on the World Poker Tour and captured one WPT title.

- 2002 World Poker Finals - 2nd place ($186,900)
- WPT Invitational Tournament - Winner ($125,000)
- 2004 UltimateBet.Com Poker Classic - 2nd place ($500,000)
- 2008 Legends of Poker - 8th place ($105,620)

== Death ==
It was announced on July 19, 2021, that Flack was found dead. According to Clark County coroner Melanie Rouse, the cause of death was listed as fentanyl, cocaine and methamphetamine intoxication. He was 52.

Flack was inducted into the Poker Hall of Fame posthumously in 2022.
