= John D'Agostino (poker player) =

American poker player (born 1982)

- Nickname: Jdags
- Born: November 3, 1982 (age 44)

World Series of Poker
- Bracelet: None
- Money finishes: 3
- Highest WSOP Main Event finish: None

World Poker Tour
- Title: None
- Final tables: 3
- Money finishes: 7

John D'Agostino (born November 3, 1982) is an American professional poker player. As of 2024, his total live tournament winnings exceed $1,900,000.

D'Agostino placed 5th in the second season World Poker Tour (WPT) PokerStars Caribbean Poker Adventure event, winning $99,450 in his first major tournament cash. In July 2004, he finished runner-up in the $10,000 No Limit Hold'em event at Championship Poker in Verona for $250,000.

At the 2004 United States Poker Championship, he had a huge chip lead heading into the final table. However, a bad beat against Hoyt Corkins led to D'Agostino's pocket 10s losing to quad 7s, leaving John with just one chip before he was eliminated in 6th place.

He made a second WPT final table in the fourth season Borgata Poker Open event, where he finished in 4th place, earning $349,685. Later in the season he finished 2nd to Michael "The Grinder" Mizrachi in the 2006 Borgata Winter Poker Open, earning $591,312.

== Personal life ==
D'Agostino is from Seymour, Connecticut. He had previously lived in Egg Harbor City, New Jersey.
