= Scott Fischman =

American poker player (born 1980)

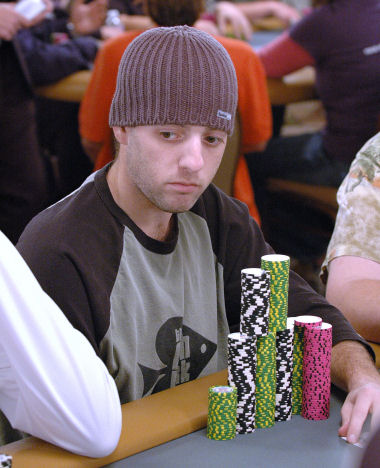
- Fischman at the 2006 World Series of Poker
- Nickname: emptyseat88
- Born: 1980 (age 45–46); Langhorne, Pennsylvania, U.S.

World Series of Poker
- Bracelets: 2
- Money finishes: 11

World Poker Tour
- Title: None
- Final table: None
- Money finishes: 3

Scott Fischman (born 1980 in Langhorne, Pennsylvania) is an American professional poker player based in Las Vegas, Nevada.

== Poker career ==
Fischman grew up in South Jersey and moved to Las Vegas at the age of 12. He was introduced to poker by a school friend and went on to become a poker dealer at the Sahara and The Mirage. At the 2004 World Series of Poker (WSOP), he became the youngest person ever to win two WSOP bracelets, winning one bracelet in a no limit Texas hold'em and a second in a H.O.R.S.E. tournament.

In 2003, Fischman became a member of the poker-playing group "The Crew," which also included Dutch Boyd, Bobby Boyd, David Smyth, Joe Bartholdi Jr, Tony Lazar, and Brett Jungblut.

In 2004, Fischman defeated Joe Cassidy to win the World Poker Tour (WPT) Young Guns of Poker invitational event. In 2005 he finished 2nd to Allen Cunningham in the WSOP $1,500 no-limit hold'em event.

In 2008, Fischman made the final table in the Main Event at the World Series of Poker Europe, finishing in 6th place.

Fischman has competed in and served as a guest commentator for the Ultimate Poker Challenge. As "emptyseat88", he plays on numerous online poker cardrooms.

As of 2010, his total live tournament winnings exceed $2,600,000. His 11 cashes at the WSOP account for $1,121,419 of those winnings.

World Series of Poker bracelets
Year	Tournament	Prize (US$)
2004	$2,000 H.O.R.S.E.	$100,200
2004	$1,500 No Limit Hold'em	$300,000

== Bibliography ==
- Online Ace: A World Series of Poker Champion's Guide to Mastering Internet Poker (2006) ISBN 1-933060-12-3
