= Jennifer Leigh =

American poker player (born 1983)

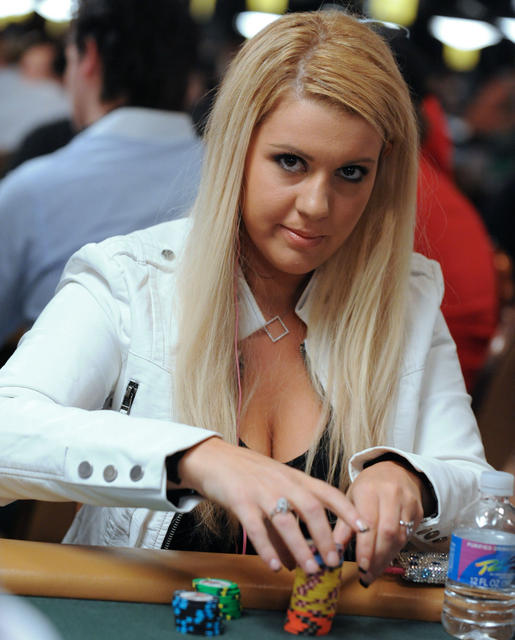
- Leigh at the 2010 World Series of Poker
- Nickname: Jennicide
- Born: August 10, 1983 (age 43); Wilmington, Delaware, U.S.

World Series of Poker
- Bracelet: None
- Money finish: 1
- Highest WSOP Main Event finish: None

World Poker Tour
- Title: None
- Final table: None
- Money finishes: 2

Jennifer Leigh (born August 10, 1983, in Wilmington, Delaware) is an American professional poker player.

Leigh built up from playing $5 sit and go online poker tournaments to playing $100/$200 limit hold'em cash games. She also cashed in the $1,000 limit hold'em event of the World Championship of Online Poker.

Leigh's nickname "Jennicide" was her alias on hacking bulletin boards when she was younger. She was at one time involved in beige boxing. (Leigh has described herself as a nerd, with knowledge of Linux and C# programming.)

Whilst Leigh is best known for playing online poker at PokerStars, she was also involved in the Poker Royale: Battle of the Ages series. She won two preliminary heats and went on to finish 5th in the Grand Final. She finished in the money in the World Poker Tour (WPT) 2006 Caribbean Poker Adventure.

Leigh has blogged about reaching level 70 on World of Warcraft, previously played the MMORPG EverQuest, and is now actively playing Aion.

Leigh has also posed for FHM Online in 2007, and appeared in the May 2008 issue of Playboy.

As of 2016, her live tournament winnings exceed $71,000.
