= Erin Ness =

American poker player, photo producer, and television personality

- Born: December 9, 1978 (age 47)

World Series of Poker
- Bracelet: None
- Money finish: 1
- Highest WSOP Main Event finish: 207th, 2004

Erin Ness (born December 9, 1978) is an American poker player, former photo producer for Maxim Magazine, and television personality, including appearances on GSN's Poker Royale.

In 2004, she was the third highest placing woman in the Main Event of the World Series of Poker (WSOP), finishing in the money in 207th place.

She continues to play poker online and in casinos. As of 2010, her total live tournament winnings exceed $20,000.

A graduate of Georgetown University, Ness lives in New York City.
