= Wendeen H. Eolis =

American business woman

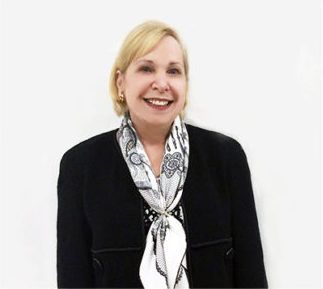
- Born: October 13, 1944 (age 82); New York City, New York, U.S.

World Series of Poker
- Bracelet: None
- Money finishes: 7
- Highest WSOP Main Event finish: 20th, 1993

World Poker Tour
- Title: None
- Final table: 0(+1)
- Money finish: 1

Wendeen H. Eolis (born October 13, 1944) is an American entrepreneur, a legal consultant, an experienced public official, and a government advisor. She also holds the distinction of being the first woman ever to cash in the main event of the World Series of Poker. As noted in The American Lawyer magazine, she is the "founder of EOLIS, the first search firm exclusively for attorneys”, the "inventor of the legal search industry”, and founder of the National Association of Legal Search Consultants (NALSC).

Eolis is a recognized pioneer, innovator, and leader in her field. In addition to her business activities, Eolis also has devoted time to public service. A longtime friend and career consultant to Rudy Giuliani, she was part of his inner circle and a close advisor during his first year as Mayor. Thereafter, she served as the first assistant and senior advisor to New York Governor George Pataki, starting in 1995.

Following her stint in the Pataki Administration, Eolis returned to her business. In 2002, Richard Parsons, then president of Time Warner, Inc. introduced her to then Secretary of State, Colin Powell. She was tapped to head Hope’s Champion Task Force, a post 9/11 initiative to assist the government with recommendations of lawyers, principally in the aftermath of terrorism events and other incidents of violence. She has been the chief operating officer and civilian commander of HCTF for more than 20 years.

Her roots in the gaming industry began in the 1960s as a professional blackjack counter which led to her meeting executives at Caesars Palace and getting an early search assignment to find an in-house general counsel for the newly public Caesars World, Inc. Soon thereafter, Caesars also hired Eolis to recommend special counsel and then brought her on as a special advisor to the Caesars World Board of Directors. Her business has since included various casino clients.

At 40, Eolis took up poker as a new hobby. A year later she became the first woman to cash in the main event of the World Series of Poker in 1986. Seven years later she became the first woman in the WSOP Main Event to cash for a second time. She was a celebrity poker player on televised poker programming from 1986- 2018.

Eolis’ combined career in business, politics, and poker has attracted attention from varied media, with multiple profiles in the New York Times , a feature story in GQ Magazine, an appearance on Court TV as a guest commentator, an appearance on A&E Biography as a subject, and featured profiles in Poker News, the National Enquirer, Board Intelligence, and Bloomberg Law. She has been interviewed on-the-record in reports on Rudy Giuliani, appearing onscreen in a BBC feature and in the 2022 film "Rudy! A Documusical."

As of 2026, Eolis continues as her company’s CEO, remains active in public service, and was a player in the main event of the 2026 World Series of Poker.

== Career Path ==
Following her graduation from New York University with a BA degree and having given up PhD studies, Eolis started her legal headhunting business with two assignments, one from the law firm of Cravath Swaine and Moore and the other from the New York Port Authority. She became active in the personnel industry. At 30, she was elected president of the Association of Personnel Services of New York State (APCNY).

Ten years later she founded and served as chairman of the board of directors of the National Association of Legal Search Consultants (NALSC). In her forties, Eolis became active in New York City and New York State politics, and also became interested in poker.

Eolis is a lecturer and public speaker and an instructor on UStream for New York's Learning Annex, where she teaches people reading principles for use in business, politics, and poker. She also has been a member of the board of directors of various not for profit organizations, notably including WNYC and New Yorkers for Children. She is also a journalist with substantial writing credits for professional trade journals and poker media.

== Law and Business ==
Eolis is the CEO of EOLIS International Group and Wendeen Eolis Enterprises, Inc, which hosts the Eolis Institute for Leadership. She founded her attorney search business in 1967 and was early in developing her practice in law firm mergers and acquisitions. Eolis's experience in law firm mergers dates back to 1988 as a panelist on law firm mergers of that era with a notable presentation on the subject at the 1988 American Lawyer Conference "Making Deals, Mergers, and Lateral Hires," headed by Steven Brill. In addition to her law firm merger work, she thereafter expanded her services to include attorney career transition counseling and related legal talent consulting services. In 2010, she added to her practice, boardroom searches that include candidates with law degrees. Her legal consulting activities include expert witness testimony in federal and state court and at arbitrations, as well as searches for special counsel and media relations counseling.

== Politics and Government ==
Eolis has been involved in politics since the 70's. She was involved in the development of updated legislation regarding the executive recruiting industry. While president of APCNY, Ms. Eolis was recognized with a "special citation" by the New York State Senate for her contribution to the modernization of employment agency laws in New York State.

In the late 80's Eolis was a friend and advisor to Rudy Giuliani, working with him on his plans, including his initial Mayoral campaign. Then, after his first election, in 1993, she served on his transition team, and later as an advisor in City Hall operations, including: communications, law department, and personnel matters. In 2008, at a Rudy Giuliani stump speech as a Presidential candidate, Eolis acknowledged to Wayne Barrett, journalist and Giuliani biographer that the former Mayor was enamored with a new crowd of Texas politicians and strategists. In a 2018 Washington Post article about Giuliani's appointment to President Donald Trump's personal legal team, Eolis noted that she had not been aware of a close friendship between Trump and Giuliani during the several years she worked with him.

Eolis served in the Pataki Administration (appointment 1995) as first assistant to the governor and senior advisor on "special projects" including personnel matters, rent deregulation, and gaming issues.

Since 9/11, she has headed Hope's Champion Task Force; working with government authorities on various attorney vetting projects related to government crises, and on various government appointments.

== Gaming Industry Consulting ==
Eolis also works with gaming and related hospitality companies as a consultant on contracts and regulatory affairs, as well as counsel selections. She also does special reports and writes about legal and business-gaming issues. She also is a public speaker and, and writes periodically about land-based, tribal, and online gaming matters.

In September 2010, Eolis was a finalist in the nominations for the London-based Women in Gaming Awards, and since then Eolis has been a moderator at the inaugural Monaco iGaming conference, sponsored by the principality and HRH Prince Albert of Monaco, and has been a featured speaker at international gaming conferences.

== Poker ==
Eolis has cashed a total of seven times at the World Series of Poker (WSOP) and was appointed to the World Series of Poker Players Advisory Council (PAC) in 2006. She was the first woman to cash in the main event of the WSOP (1986) and the first one to do it twice (1993). She has since cashed at the WSOP in 2003, 2004, 2006, 2007, and 2009. The WSOP issued a commemorative chip for her "milestone" for women (1996). Commissioner of the WSOP, Jeffrey Pollack, dubbed Eolis the "grand dame of poker". Eolis also won the European Open No Limit Hold'em Tournament in 1990 and has cashed in the World Poker Tour, and the United States Poker Championship. Eolis was elected to the Professional Poker Tour (2004–05).

She was a pioneer for women in major poker competition, and was a regular at the Mayfair Club. In 2008, Eolis was elected Chairman of the World Poker Association, serving until midsummer, when she became a legal consultant in the 2008 US presidential elections. Eolis also served as a member of the Players Advisory Council of the World Series of Poker (WSOP) and was the Chair of the WSOP International Players Advisory Council. She is referred by former WSOP Commissioner Jeffery Pollack as the “Grand Dame of Poker." She also was elected to the Seniors (Poker) Hall of Fame in 2016.

== Publications ==
Eolis’ published writings include articles for the New York Law Journal, Women's Business of New York, Poker Player Newspaper (2002-2015), and Bluff Magazine, among others. Eolis has written numerous articles on the Unlawful Internet Gambling Enforcement Act of 2006 (UIGEA) and subsequent congressional proposals to reverse the UIGEA legislation. Her writing on the investigation into PokerStars was referenced in an American Gambling Association court filing. She is also the author of Raising the Stakes, the Story of the Power Poker Dame and People Reading Secrets.

== Personal Life ==
Eolis was born in New York City, of Russian-Jewish immigrant parents, both highly-successful lawyers. In the early 1950’s she briefly attended grade school at PS6 at the newly-built site. From her early childhood, she studied classical piano and later graduated from the High School of the Performing Arts in New York City. She obtained her BA degree in philosophy from NYU, already married and raising three children. She abandoned graduate studies, favoring work as a Playboy Bunny and as a blackjack cardcounting expert at casinos to supplement her income as a beginner in her legal search firm. Eolis is a grandmother with family and business in London and New York.
