= Joe Bartholdi Jr. =

American poker player

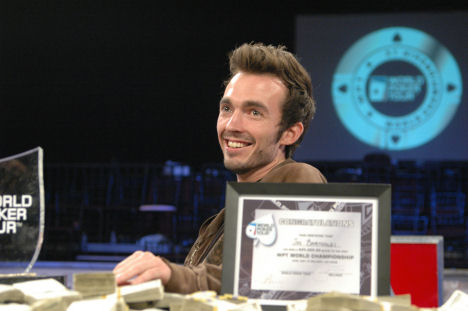
- Bartholdi after winning 2006 World Poker Tour Five Star tournament
- Nickname: None

World Series of Poker
- Bracelet: None
- Money finishes: 8
- Highest WSOP Main Event finish: None

World Poker Tour
- Title: 1
- Final table: 1
- Money finish: 1

Joseph N. Bartholdi Jr. is an American professional poker player. As of June 2022, his total live tournament winnings exceed $4,500,000.

== Early years ==
Bartholdi moved to Las Vegas at the age of 18 to be alongside his father who worked as a poker dealer at Binion's Horseshoe. He began playing poker in the area's casinos despite being underage, first concentrating on stud poker and later on Texas hold 'em. He turned professional at the age of 21, but lost much of his profits due to poor bankroll management and playing blackjack. He ended up taking a job as a poker dealer at Binion's Horseshoe to maintain a daily buy-in the 10/20 Hold 'em game.

== The Crew ==
Bartholdi met poker pro Dutch Boyd at the 2002 World Series of Poker (WSOP), who invited him to become a member of the poker playing group he founded known as "The Crew" which included Bobby Boyd, David Smyth, Tony Lazar, and Brett Jungblut. Later, Bartholdi felt he had let the group down when losing $4,000 after tilting in online poker and left the group. However, he maintains that they all remain friends.

== Recent times ==
In 2004, Bartholdi built a new bankroll from a $50 bonus up to $250,000, however lost it again due to his ongoing bankroll management issues. At the 2005 WSOP, Joe Cassidy staked Bartholdi in numerous poker tournaments, including the $1,500 no limit hold'em event, where he finished 5th, earning $71,445, which was his largest tournament cash at the time. Bartholdi also won an event in the Ultimate Poker Challenge's second season.

Cassidy and Bartholdi swapped 50% with each other for the 2006 World Poker Tour (WPT) season 4 $25,000 no limit hold 'em championship event. Bartholdi outlasted 604 other players to win the event and claim the $3,760,165 first prize. He subsequently made the final table of the WPT Battle of Champions IV event.

In 2011 Bartholdi again entered the WPT's season 10 main event at the Bellagio Casino and Resort but was unable to place in the money.

In September 2018, twelve years after his massive win on season 4 of the World Poker Tour, Bartholdi entered the WPT's Borgata Poker Open.

During 2019 and 2020, Bartholdi cashed in twenty-six WSOP.com tournaments.

In 2022 Dutch Boyd sued Bartholdi for an unpaid prop bet they made during their "The Crew" days. In 2006 Boyd and Bartholdi entered into a 10K prop bet which centered on who would win the most WSOP bracelets within the following 10 years. Boyd won three bracelets while Bartholdi won none. Between 2016 (when the prop bet was over and the 10K came due) and 2021, Bartholdi had slowly paid Boyd $1,500 of the $10,000. In an effort to both accelerate and force payment, Boyd took Bartholdi to court but lost the civil lawsuit because, according to Hearing Master Amy L. Ferreira's judgement, “The agreement was made verbally and no written document was created at the time of said agreement. Therefore, according to NRS [Nevada Revised Statutes] 111.220, the agreement is void. As a result, Boyd [was] awarded nothing against the defendant [Bartholdi]." After the judgment was rendered, Bartholdi said “I am paying what I owe to Dutch — but I guess it wasn't fast enough and he sued me. I am still paying what I owe.” Boyd responded by with: “This whole experience has turned me off of ever making a prop bet with a friend again. I wish we never made the bet.”

On May 26, 2022, Bartholdi finished in first place in the $1,700 No Limit Hold 'em Deepest Stack event in the Seminole Hard Rock Deep Stack Series, in Hollywood, FL. The prize of $125,025 is his largest tournament winnings since his 2006 WPT championship event win of 3.7 million dollars which he split with Joe Cassidy as they had 50% of one another.
