= Linda Johnson (poker player) =

American poker player, journalist, and consultant (born 1953)

- Nickname: The First Lady of Poker
- Born: October 14, 1953 (age 73); Long Island, New York, U.S.

World Series of Poker
- Bracelet: 1
- Money finishes: 14

World Poker Tour
- Money finish: 1

Linda Johnson (born October 14, 1953) is an American professional poker player, journalist and consultant, based in Las Vegas, Nevada. She was inducted into the Poker Hall of Fame in 2011.

== Early life ==
Linda Johnson was born in Long Island, New York. Before becoming involved in poker, Johnson worked for the United States Postal Service and traveled to Las Vegas regularly to play blackjack. Her father, a career service member, convinced her that playing poker was the best way to gamble as it was not played against the house.

== Poker playing career ==
Johnson began playing poker in 1974 and won a World Series of Poker (WSOP) bracelet in 1997 in the $1,500 seven-card razz event.

She also appeared in the Poker Royale: Comedians vs. Pros series.

Johnson was an inaugural inductee into the Women's Poker Hall of Fame in 2008

Johnson was inducted into the Poker Hall of Fame in 2011

In 2017, She was the inaugural inductee into the WPT Honors Club, representing outstanding contributions to the WPT and the greater poker community.

As of 2025, her total live tournament winnings exceed $469,659.

== Other poker activities ==
Johnson is known as "The First Lady of Poker", a phrase coined by Mike Sexton due to her lengthy association with the game, in particular the World Poker Tour (WPT) as she explains in the Ladies Night episode of WPT Season 6.

She worked as the publisher of CardPlayer Magazine for eight years, before selling the company to Barry Shulman. However, she still writes articles for the magazine. Johnson is one of the founding members of the Tournament Directors Association (TDA), which sets common rules for tournaments such as the WPT. She continues to be involved with the TDA by serving on the Board of Directors.

Johnson was one of the founders of the World Poker Tour and was the announcer to the studio audience for its first six seasons. In addition, she was an owner and founding partner in Card Player Cruises for 33 years and is currently a partner in Poker Player Cruises.

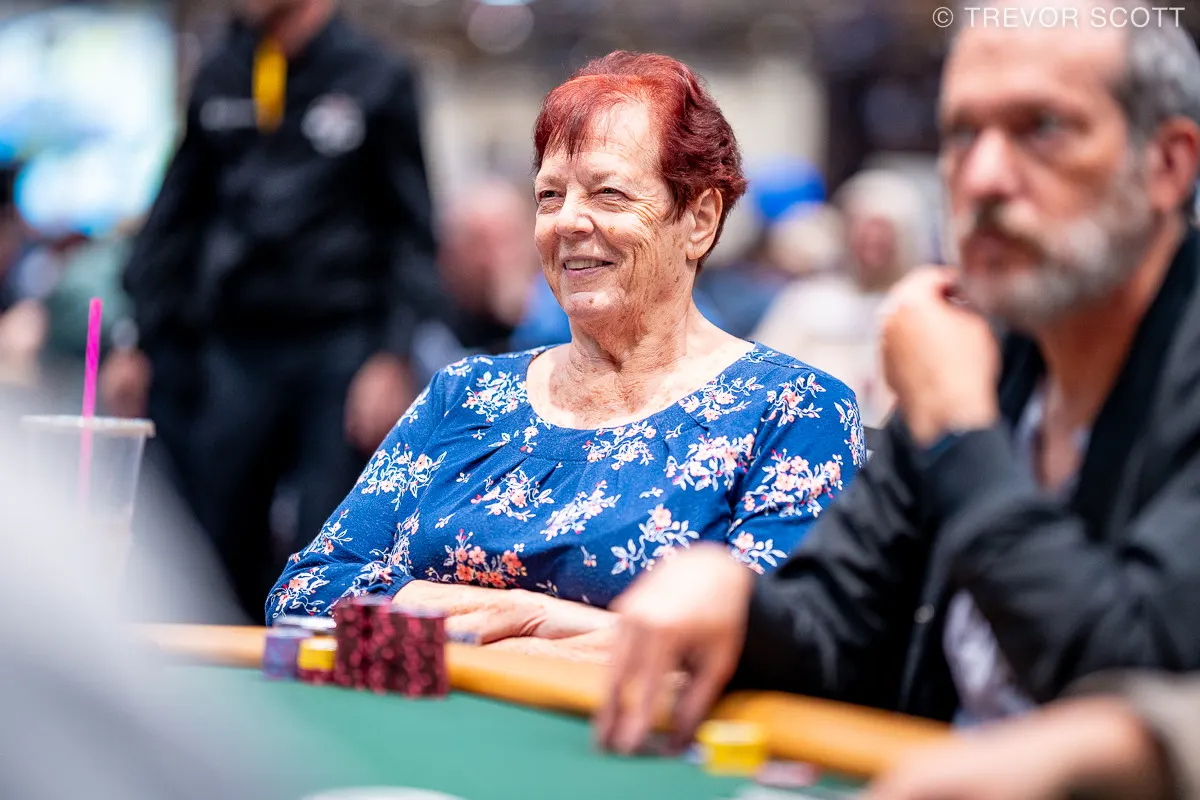
Linda Johnson playing at a poker event June 2025

In 2009, Johnson helped found PokerGives.org, a nonprofit organization that makes it easier for poker players to donate to charity.

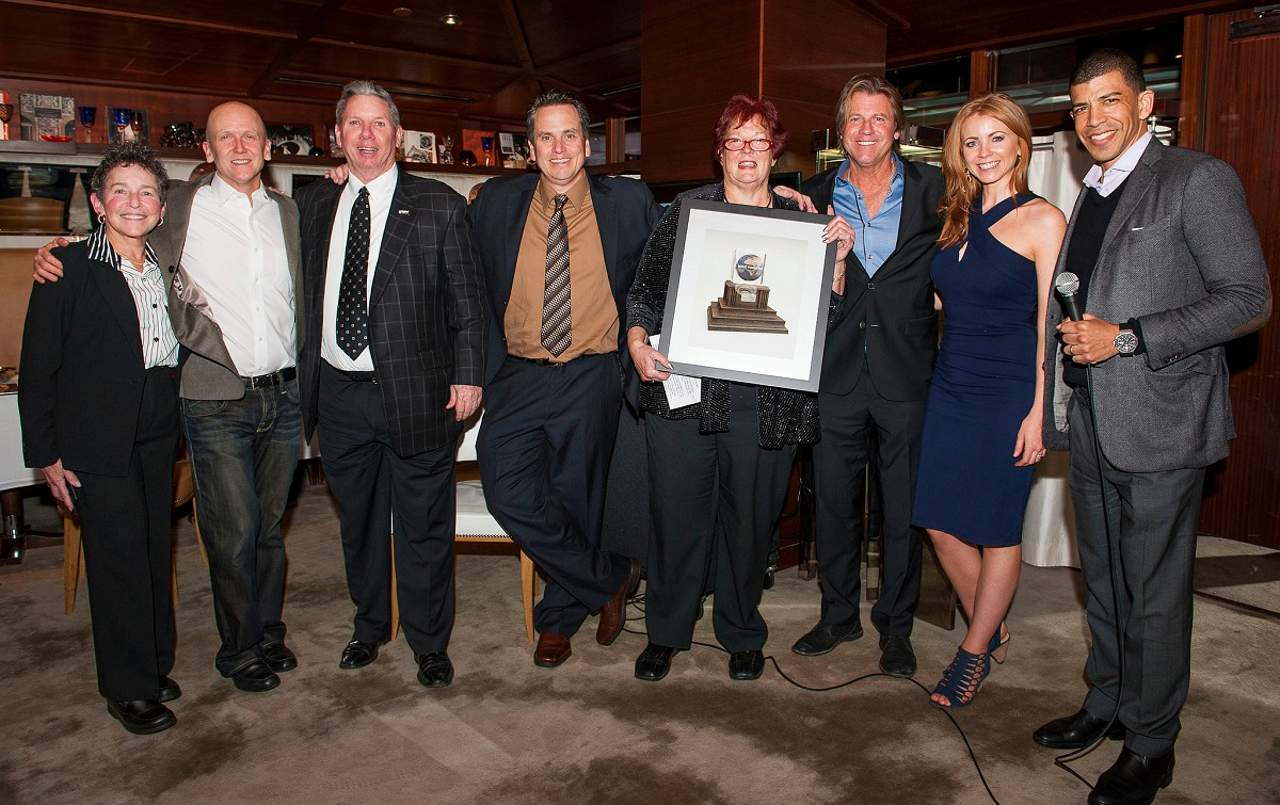
Linda Johnson WPT Honors Club

On Monday, February 27, 2017, the World Poker Tour awarded Johnson with the inaugural WPT Honors Award, representing outstanding contributions to the WPT and the greater poker community. “We are proud to present Linda Johnson with the inaugural WPT Honors Award,” said Adam Pliska, CEO of the World Poker Tour. “The award represents WPT’s highest honor and will serve as a lasting tradition that allows us to recognize the most important people in our industry and in the WPT’s history. Linda played a unique role in helping shape the World Poker Tour, and she embodies all that the WPT stands for."

Johnson has been a proponent of women in poker and has hosted hundreds of ladies event around the world.

She won the California Ladies State Championship and has cashed in a plethora of ladies events.

Johnson has taught WPT Boot Camp for six years.

She was the original chairperson for the Poker Players Association.

She has traveled all over the world consulting with various poker rooms.
