= J. J. Liu =

Taiwanese-born American poker player (born 1965)

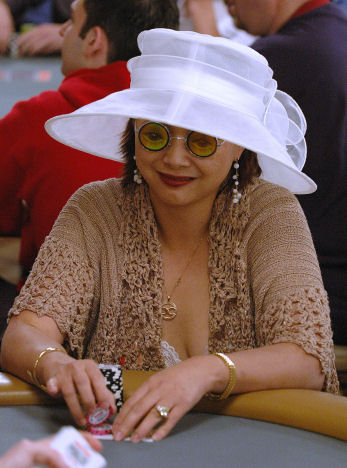
- Liu in the 2006 World Series of Poker
- Nickname: J. J.
- Born: Joanne Jishung Liu; April 10, 1965 (age 61); Taipei, Taiwan

World Series of Poker
- Bracelet: None
- Money finishes: 43
- Highest WSOP Main Event finish: 442nd, 2017

World Poker Tour
- Title: 0 (+1)
- Final tables: 2 (+1)
- Money finishes: 5 (+1)

Joanne Jishung Liu (born April 10, 1965 in Taipei, Taiwan) is a professional poker player from Palo Alto, California. She was in 2007 the highest placing female in a World Poker Tour Championship event, finishing runner-up to Ted Forrest at the WPT Bay 101 Shooting Stars.

As of 2024, her total live tournament winnings exceed $3,800,000. She ranks 7th in live tournament earnings among female players, behind Vanessa Selbst, Kathy Liebert, Annie Duke, Annette Obrestad, Liv Boeree and Vanessa Rousso.

Liu was born in Taiwan, and moved to Peoria, Illinois to pursue a master's degree in computer engineering at Bradley University. After graduation, she took a job as a software engineer in Silicon Valley. It was there that she discovered her love for poker, having never played it until she came to the United States.
