= Brett Jungblut =

American poker player

- Nickname: Gank

World Series of Poker
- Bracelet: 1
- Money finishes: 23
- Highest WSOP Main Event finish: None

Brett Jungblut is an American professional poker player, born in Atlantic City, New Jersey and based in Las Vegas, Nevada. With only one class left to graduate college, Jungblut dropped out to pursue his dream as a professional poker player.

Jungblut attended Voorhees High School, graduated in 1997.

Jungblut began playing tournament poker in 2002. His significant in the money tournament finishes including first-place finishes at the Bicycle Casino's Winnin' o' the Green limit Texas hold 'em event and the World Series of Poker (WSOP) Omaha Hi-Lo World championship in 2004.

Jungblut was a former member of "The Crew" alongside Scott Fischman, Dutch Boyd, Joe Bartholdi and others.

Jungblut helped organize the first Los Angeles Youth Network All In For The Kids" benefit poker tournament, raising funds for building new housing facilities and schools for homeless children.

Since 2005, Jungblut has been teaching poker strategy via his Pro Poker School website. In 2009, Jungblut signed on as a team pro with Lock Poker.

As of 2018, his total live tournament winnings exceed $470,000.
