= Bill Gazes =

American poker player

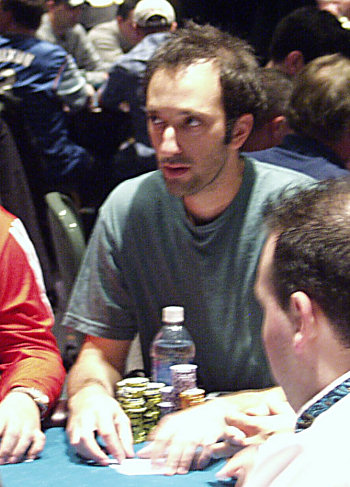
- Bill Gazes at the WPT 2005 World Poker Finals

World Series of Poker
- Bracelet: None
- Money finishes: 28
- Highest WSOP Main Event finish: 42nd, 2001

World Poker Tour
- Title: None
- Final tables: 2
- Money finishes: 9

European Poker Tour
- Title: None
- Final table: None
- Money finish: 1

William G. Gazes (born December 25) is an American professional poker player from Las Vegas, Nevada, who in his career has made over $2.2 million in live tournament earnings and was a sponsored player on Full Tilt Poker known as a Full Tilt Pro.

Gazes, whose ex-wife is fellow professional poker player Kristy Gazes, has been playing in live tournaments since 1993. Although he is without a World Series of Poker (WSOP) bracelet or a World Poker Tour (WPT) title, Gazes has cashed nine times in the WPT and 28 times at the WSOP.

== Poker career ==
=== World Series of Poker ===
Gazes's largest cashes at the WSOP include coming in fourth in the 1997 World Series of Poker $2,000 No Limit Hold'em event, earning $46,150, a final table which included Ron Stanley (3rd) and "Miami" John Cernuto (winner). Gazes cashed in the 2005 World Series of Poker $1,500 No Limit Hold'em event finishing third for $202,790 and was runner-up at the 2007 World Series of Poker $5,000 H.O.R.S.E event, earning $153,408.

Gazes was noted for his appearance on the 2007 World Series of Poker comical segment known as "The Nuts", were after kicking a football in a field goal attempt during a prop bet between him and professional players Daniel Negreanu, Josh Arieh, and Erick Lindgren, and having missed and fallen on his attempt, a female ESPN intern threw it towards him in order to return the ball in the field of play but instead Gazes was struck directly in the face by the football as he was lying on his back.

=== World Poker Tour ===
Gazes has cashed nine times at the WPT championship events, making two final tables; his first was at the 2004 L.A. Poker Classic where he finished fourth, earning $226,890, his second was at the 2005 World Poker Finals in Mashantucket where he finished third for $759,000, his biggest cash to date and nearly making another six-handed televised final table earlier at the 2004 PokerStars Caribbean Adventure, finishing in eighth place for $43,095.

=== Other poker events ===
Gazes won a $500 Omaha Hi-Low event at the 1999 Legends of Poker in Los Angeles, earning $21,800 and the $1,500 No Limit Hold'em event in 2000 at the Carnivale of Poker III in Las Vegas, earning $111,142.

He has one cash at the European Poker Tour (EPT), where he finished in 15th place in the £3,000 No Limit Hold'em Championship event, earning £5,000 ($8,987) and has cashed three times at the Crown Australian Poker Championship.

As of 2024, his total live tournament winnings exceed $2,300,000. His 34 cashes as the WSOP account for $643,698 of those winnings.
