= Bob Feduniak =

American poker player

Bob Feduniak is an American poker player from Las Vegas, Nevada.

== Poker career ==
Feduniak has been a veteran of the live poker tournament circuit for over 25 years. His biggest career cash is $66,720, which came in the 2001 World Series of Poker $3,000 No Limit Hold'em event, where he finished in fourth place.

As of 2010, Feduniak's lifetime poker winnings exceed $405,000.

== Personal life ==
Bob is married to fellow poker player Maureen Feduniak. The couple resides in Las Vegas. In addition to poker, he is considered to be successful trader.
