= Amir Vahedi =

Iranian poker player (1961–2010)

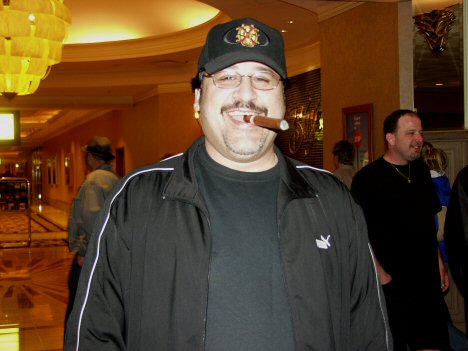
- Vahedi at the 2006 World Series of Poker circuit event
- Born: 25 February 1961; Tehran, Iran
- Died: 8 January 2010 (aged 48)

World Series of Poker
- Bracelet: 1
- Final tables: 4
- Money finishes: 9
- Highest WSOP Main Event finish: 6th, 2003

World Poker Tour
- Title: None
- Final table: None
- Money finishes: 9

Amir Vahedi (25 February 1961 – 8 January 2010) was an Iranian professional poker player born in Tehran, Iran. who won a World Series of Poker (WSOP) bracelet at the 2003 World Series of Poker in the $1,500 No Limit Hold'em event.

== World Series of Poker ==
In 2003, Vahedi made the final table of the Main Event of the World Series of Poker and finished sixth, earning $250,000. Earlier in the series, he won his first WSOP bracelet in the $1,500 No Limit Hold'em event for $270,000.

During the 2003 World Series of Poker, in reference to the natural tendency of players to tighten up on the bubble, which are when only a few eliminations are left to the money, Vahedi stated: "In order to live, you must be willing to die."

Vahedi was also the season three Grand Final winner of the Ultimate Poker Challenge.

During his lifetime, Vahedi won over $3,250,000 in live tournament play. His nine cashes at the WSOP account for $671,216 of those winnings.

=== World Series of Poker bracelet ===
Year	Event	Prize Money
2003	$1,500 No Limit Hold'em	$270,000

== Personal life ==
Vahedi served in the Iranian army during the Iran–Iraq War before becoming a war refugee and immigrating to the United States, settling in Sherman Oaks, California. He was one of Ben Affleck's early poker tutors.

Vahedi died at the age of 48 due to possible complications of diabetes on 8 January 2010.
