= Evelyn Ng =

Canadian poker player (born 1975)

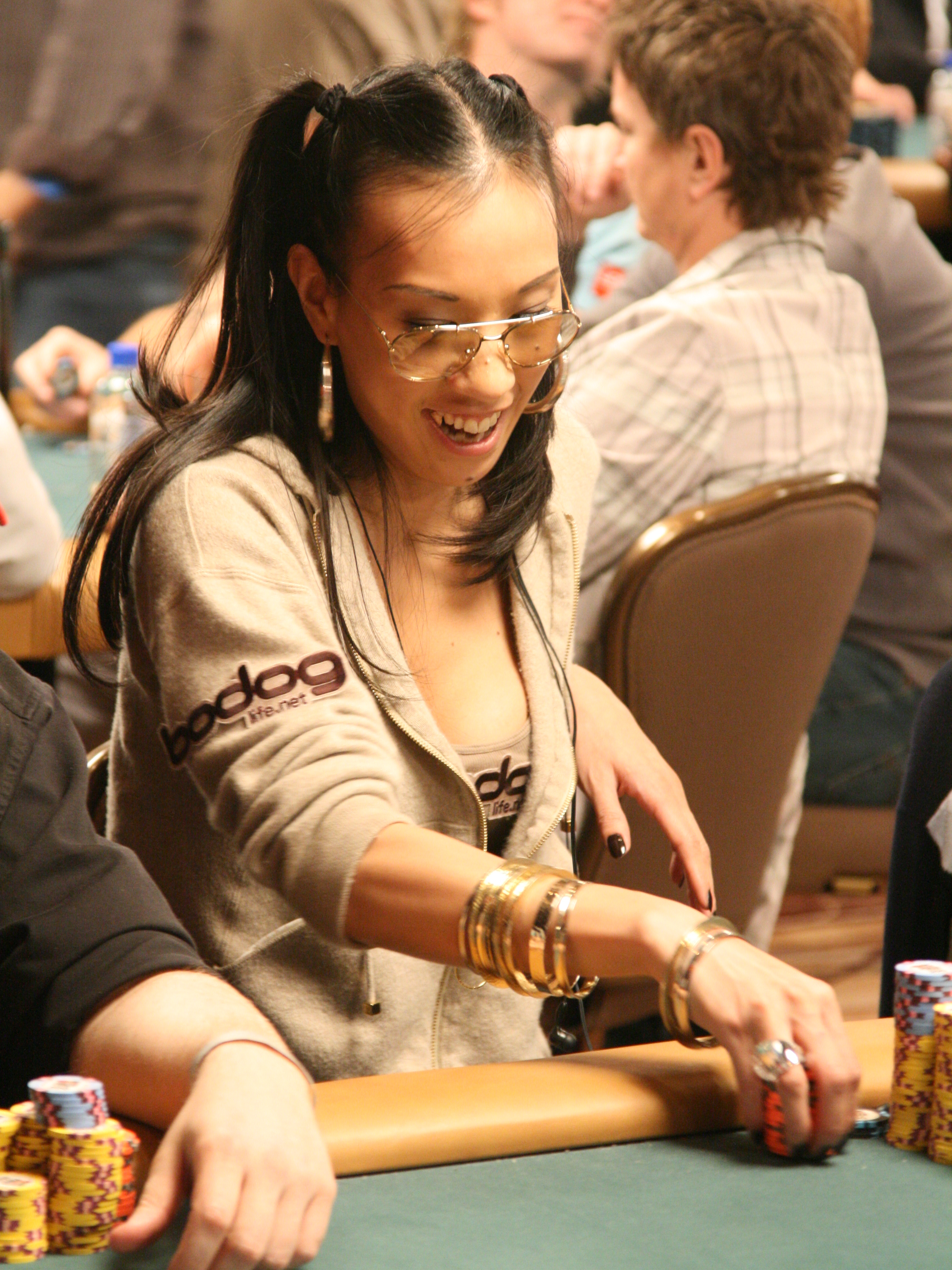
- Evelyn Ng at the 2008 World Series of Poker
- Nickname: Evybabee
- Born: September 14, 1975 (age 51)

World Series of Poker
- Bracelet: None
- Money finishes: 10
- Highest WSOP Main Event finish: 238th, 2008

World Poker Tour
- Title: None
- Final table: 0 (+1)
- Money finishes: 4

Evelyn Ng (born September 14, 1975 in Toronto, Ontario) is a Canadian professional poker player. She lives in Toronto, Ontario, Canada.

== Early life ==
Ng began her gaming career playing pool for money at age 14. By age 17, she had expanded into dealing blackjack and poker games in her hometown of Toronto. Around that time, she dated fellow Canadian poker player Daniel Negreanu. He helped her develop a style of play designed to combat aggressive players.

== Poker career ==
Ng achieved fame on the World Poker Tour (WPT) circuit in 2003 after placing second to Clonie Gowen in the Ladies' Night I tournament, finishing ahead of established professionals including Annie Duke, Kathy Liebert and Jennifer Harman.

Ng was included as one of the characters in the video game Stacked with Daniel Negreanu. Formerly a representative of the online poker room PokerStars, she is now part of Team Bodog. Ng was a participant in the King of Vegas television series on SpikeTV, and featured in the second series of British game show Casino as the poker croupier. She also appeared on Criss Angel Mindfreak as a professional poker player. Angel, having little experience in poker, attempted to psychologically persuade Ng to repeatedly pick a losing hand from a set of covered/open cards.

As of 2010, her total live tournament winnings exceed $375,000.

Ng streams frequently on Twitch under the name evybabee with a focus on Diamond Painting, Sudoku, Jeopardy, Guitar Hero / Clone Hero and other puzzle games.
