= Karina Jett =

American poker player

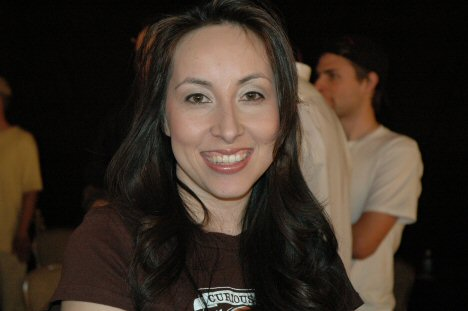
- Jett in the 2005 World Series of Poker
- Nickname: None

World Series of Poker
- Bracelet: None
- Money finishes: 10
- Highest WSOP Main Event finish: 513th, 2010

Karina Niki Jett (née Mikelis) is a professional poker player. She may be best known for her appearances on the GSN series Poker Royale Battle of the Sexes. Jett appeared and won in Poker After Dark as well as appeared in Late Night Pokers fourth season.

Her husband is fellow Full Tilt Poker pro Chip Jett, one of the world's foremost tournament players. The couple writes a column together for Card Player magazine, answering reader questions in a "he said/she said" format.

At the 2011 World Series of Poker, Jett finished second in the Ladies Championship for $119,010. This was the third time she made the final table in this event. As of 2024, her total live tournament winnings exceed $560,000.
