= Chip Jett =

American poker player (born 1974)

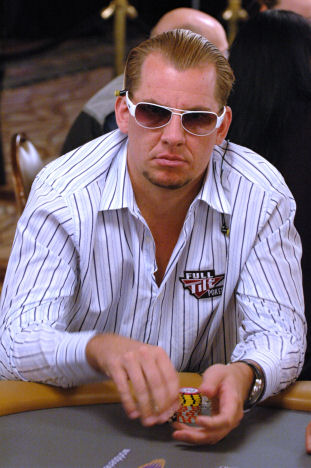
- Jett at the 2006 World Series of Poker
- Nickname: None
- Born: September 22, 1974 (age 52)

World Series of Poker
- Bracelet: None
- Money finishes: 12
- Highest WSOP Main Event finish: 161st, 2008

World Poker Tour
- Title: None
- Final tables: 2
- Money finishes: 8

Charles McRae "Chip" Jett (born September 22, 1974, in Scottsdale, Arizona) is an American professional poker player from Las Vegas, Nevada. He is one of the most popular players on the World Poker Tour.

Jett has been known as "Chip" ever since he left the hospital when he was born. The nickname was suggested by a nurse to Jett's parents. His name is considered to be an aptronym.

Jett began working as a poker dealer in an Indian casino, but turned into a professional player when he realized he was making more money as a player.

Jett finished 2nd to Howard Lederer in the World Poker Tour (WPT) PartyPoker.com Million II cruise event in March 2003. Later in the same year he made two World Series of Poker (WSOP) final tables, and another WPT final table in the Legends of Poker event won by Mel Judah.

Jett also had a 3rd-place finish in the 2005 WSOP $5,000 seven-card stud event.

He is married to fellow poker professional Karina Jett (née Mikelis). In August 2005 they both made the same final table, at the London Open event in Old Billingsgate Market. They had two children together a daughter, Athena and a son, Apollo. Four-year-old Apollo died on September 14, 2010, following an accident in the family pool.

Jett has written articles for Card Player Magazine and he and Karina wrote a column together, answering reader questions in a "he said/she said" format.

As of 2024, his total live tournament winnings exceed $2,500,000.
