= Maureen Feduniak =

American poker player

Maureen Feduniak is an American poker player from Las Vegas, Nevada.

== Poker career ==
Feduniak has been a veteran of the live poker tournament circuit going back to at least the late 1990s. Her biggest career cash is $108,564, which came in the 2006 World Series of Poker $1,500 No Limit Hold'em event, where she finished runner-up to Anders Henriksson. She has 12 career cashes and one final table appearance at the World Series of Poker.

As of 2018, Feduniak's lifetime poker winnings exceed $504,000.

== Personal life ==
Maureen is married to fellow poker player Bob Feduniak. The couple resides in Las Vegas.
