= James Van Alstyne =

American poker player (born 1966)

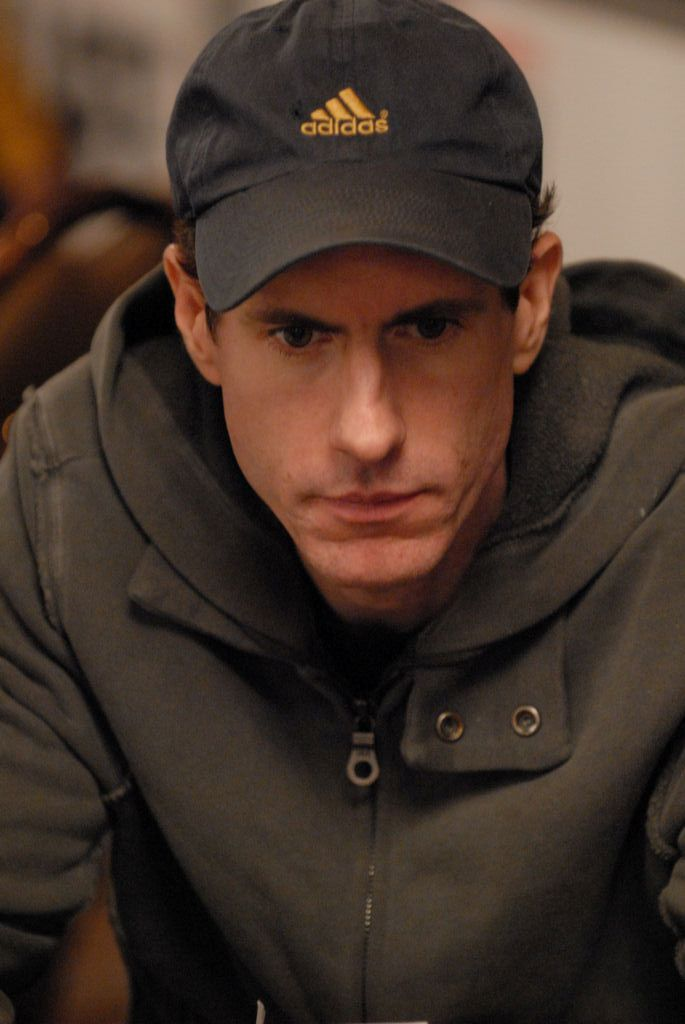
- Van Alstyne in the 2007 World Series of Poker
- Born: 1966 (age 59–60); Columbus, Georgia, U.S.

World Series of Poker
- Bracelet: 1
- Money finishes: 13
- Highest WSOP Main Event finish: 16th, 1999

World Poker Tour
- Title: None
- Final tables: 2
- Money finishes: 10

James Gibson Van Alstyne (born 1966 in Columbus, Georgia) is an American professional poker player based in Las Vegas, Nevada.

Van Alstyne grew up in New Orleans, Louisiana, and he graduated from Benjamin Franklin High School. After high school, Van Alstyne attended Stanford University, where he learned to play poker.

Van Alstyne was formerly employed as an engineer before becoming a professional blackjack player, using card-counting techniques to give himself an edge. He wears a baseball cap to disguise himself from casino security, and continues to wear the cap whilst playing poker.

Van Alstyne made three money finishes in Omaha poker tournaments at the World Series of Poker (WSOP) between 1994 and 1998. In 1999, he made his first money finish in the main event, finishing in 16th place. Van Alstyne finished in the "TV bubble" position (7th) of the World Poker Tour (WPT) Aruba Ultimate Poker Classic event in September 2005. He went on to make his first WPT TV final table in the season 4 championship event, finishing in 5th place, winning $439,475. In that event, James came in as the chip-leader, but lost the lead early—and almost 40% of his chips—on a bluff against Joe Bartholdi, who was second in chips. The bluff put Bartholdi in a prohibitive chip position, and he eventually went on to win the event. A few more hits to Alstyne's stack followed, after which a visibly shaken Alstyne was knocked out in 5th place. In the post-game interview with Courtney Friel, Alstyne said, "I just feel horrible. This is the worst final table performance in the history of poker. This was just absolutely, unbelievably bad poker."

As of 2023, his total live tournament winnings exceed $4,300,000.

== World Series of Poker Bracelets ==
Year	Tournament	Prize (US$)
2009	$1,500 H.O.R.S.E.	$247,033
