= Cyndy Violette =

American poker player (born 1959)

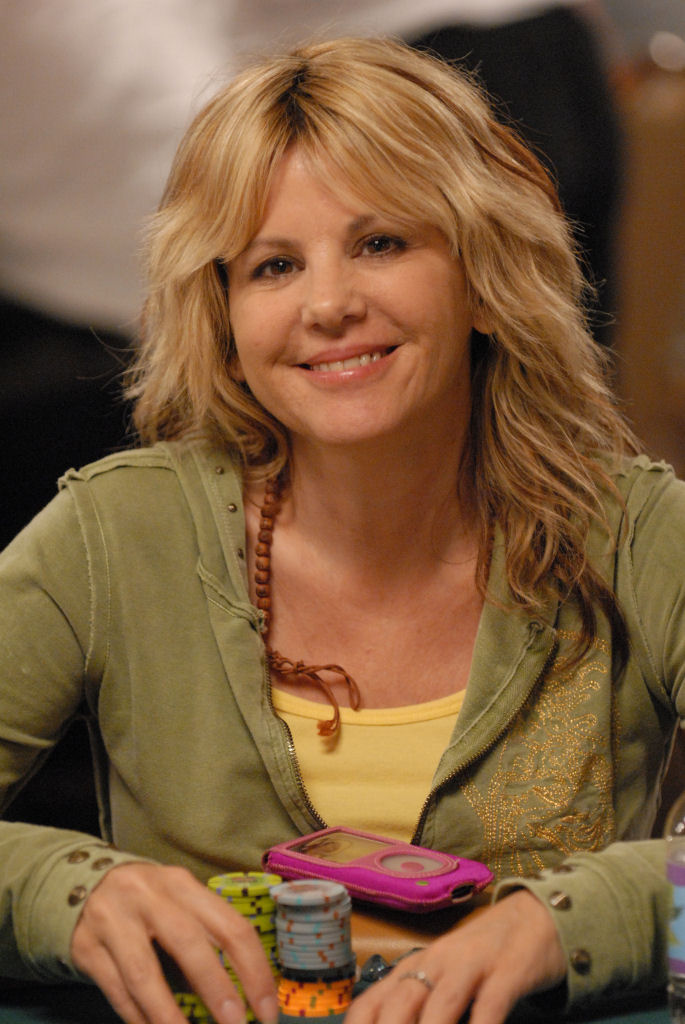
- Violette at the 2007 World Series of Poker
- Nickname: Ultra
- Born: August 19, 1959 (age 67)

World Series of Poker
- Bracelet: 1
- Money finishes: 35
- Highest WSOP Main Event finish: 400th, 2006

World Poker Tour
- Title: None
- Final table: None
- Money finishes: 2

Cyndy Violette (born August 19, 1959) is an American professional poker player who won a World Series of Poker bracelet in 2004.

== Background ==
Violette was born in Queens, New York and often played poker with family members as a child. Her family relocated to Las Vegas when she was 12 years old; Violette took to playing casino poker once she reached the legal age of 21. She spent a short time as a casino employee, working as a blackjack and poker dealer.

== Career ==
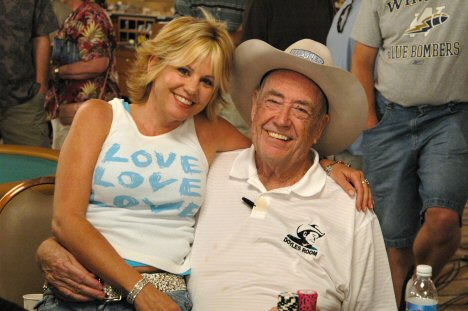
Violette with Doyle Brunson in 2005.

In 1985, Violette took the top prize of $75,000 at a seven-card stud tournament at the Golden Nugget; at the time this was the biggest tournament prize ever won by a woman. Shortly thereafter, she married her second husband, and took a two-year hiatus from poker.

In 1990, Violette returned to the poker scene by winning $62,000 in a tournament at Caesars Palace. She maintained her residence in Washington state but split time between Las Vegas and Los Angeles. In 1993, Violette divorced her husband and relocated to Atlantic City. She continued to work the poker tournament circuit and was a regular participant in the World Series of Poker (WSOP). She has also competed on the World Poker Tour (WPT).

At the 2004 World Series of Poker, Violette won a bracelet in the seven-card stud high-low split tournament. She was one of three women (Kathy Liebert and Annie Duke being the others) to win a gold bracelet in an open tournament in that year's WSOP. At the 2005 WSOP, she had her largest tournament cash to date with a runner-up finish in a $2,000 No Limit Hold'em event for $295,970. As of 2024, her total live tournament winnings exceed $1,400,000. Her 44 cashes at the WSOP account for $948,842 of those winnings.

== World Series of Poker Bracelets ==
Year	Tournament	Prize (US$)
2004	$2,000 seven-card stud high-low split	$135,900
