= Kenna James =

American poker player (born 1963)

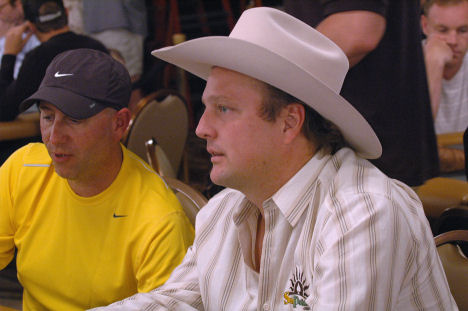
- Kenna James at the 2006 World Series of Poker
- Nickname: Cowboy
- Born: December 18, 1963 (age 62); Chicago

World Series of Poker
- Bracelet: None
- Money finishes: 36
- Highest WSOP Main Event finish: 38th, 2003

World Poker Tour
- Title: None
- Final tables: 3
- Money finishes: 4

Kenna James (born December 18, 1963, in Chicago, Illinois) is an American professional poker player, television commentator, personal coach and actor who currently resides in Las Vegas, Nevada.

== Poker career ==
James' total live tournament winnings exceed $3,500,000. James won in the 2006 LA Poker Classic, earning $242,251. In March 2006, James finished second in the $10,000 buy-in Limit Hold-em event to Mike Schneider in the fifth annual PartyPoker Million Cruise. James received $700,000 for this finish for the biggest cash of his career. James' tournament career includes over 100 final tables and more than 20 overall titles.

=== World Series of Poker ===
He has finished in the money 36 times at the World Series of Poker earning over $500,000 of his total tournament winnings at the WSOP. He has two final table appearance at the WSOP including a 4th place in the 2003 $2,500 no limit Texas hold'em event, and a 6th-place finish in the 2009 $2,500 Razz event.

=== World Poker Tour ===
Kenna James has 3 World Poker Tour (WPT) Final Tables (9th, 7th, 2nd) with one televised final table in August 2005. James finished second to Alex Kahaner at the WPT Legends of Poker $5,000 No Limit Hold'em tournament at the Bicycle Casino, earning $588,210.

== Acting and commentating career ==
Kenna James moved from Michigan to California in 1985 to pursue a career in acting. From 1985 to 1995 he performed both on stage and screen. With notable roles as Biff in "Death of a Salesman," and Hotspur in "Henry IV" at the Odyssey Playhouse in Los Angeles. He also had bit parts in t.v. soap opera's "The Bold and the Beautiful," "The Young and the Restless," and supporting roles in the independent feature films, "Deadly Diamonds," (1996) and "Whiskey, Riddles and Dandelion Wine" (1998). Leaving acting to pursue a career in poker in 1998, James still makes occasional forays into onscreen acting, most notably in crime thriller The Trust (2016); he has an extended cameo as Captain Harris opposite Nicolas Cage as police officer Jim Stone.

Kenna James commentating career began in 2005 on GSN POKER ROYAL Celebrities versus Pros. He next appeared on the Ultimate Poker Challenge, and served as a regular Guest-Host of the show alongside Chad Brown. Other appearances on WPT Canada along with Jim Van Horn and The Premiere Poker League with Jesse May in London, England, for Matchroom Sports. Currently Kenna James is the co-host of The Heartland Poker Tour, a nationally syndicated poker television show, alongside Jaymz Larson.

== Charity efforts ==
James has worked extensively with many charities, raising money for Make-A-Wish Foundation, Ante Up for Autism, Hold-em for Hero's for Fallin' Officers, Arizona Baseball Charities, Screaming Eagle Poker League and the Wounded Warrior Project. He has hosted many charity poker events. In 2006 he organized and hosted a tournament for the Wounded Warriors that raised $170,000 for the organization.
