= Robert Williamson III =

American poker player (born 1970)

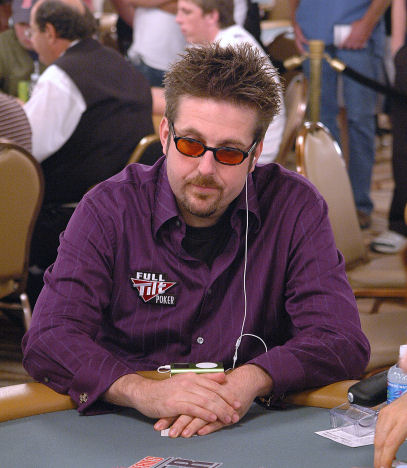
- Williamson at the 2006 World Series of Poker
- Nickname: Mr. Omaha
- Born: November 7, 1970 (age 56)

World Series of Poker
- Bracelet: 1
- Money finishes: 20
- Highest WSOP Main Event finish: None

World Poker Tour
- Title: None
- Final table: None
- Money finishes: 2

Robert Williamson III (born November 7, 1970) is an American poker player from Dallas, Texas.

Williamson grew up with three sisters in Granbury, Texas, and received B.B.A. degrees in finance and real estate from Angelo State University in San Angelo.

Williamson is known as an Omaha specialist, with numerous notable finishes in World Series of Poker (WSOP) Omaha tournaments, including his one bracelet in 2002 and numerous top-three finishes.

Williamson had gastric bypass surgery between 2002 and 2005, reducing his weight from 400 lb to 200 lb. He now claims to be "half the man [he] used to be."

As of 2023, his total live tournament winnings exceed $2,500,000. His 20 cashes at the WSOP account for $1,101,976 of those winnings.

== World Series of Poker Bracelet ==
Year	Event	Prize Money
2002 WSOP	$5,000 Pot-Limit Omaha	$201,160
