= Clonie Gowen =

American poker player (born 1971)

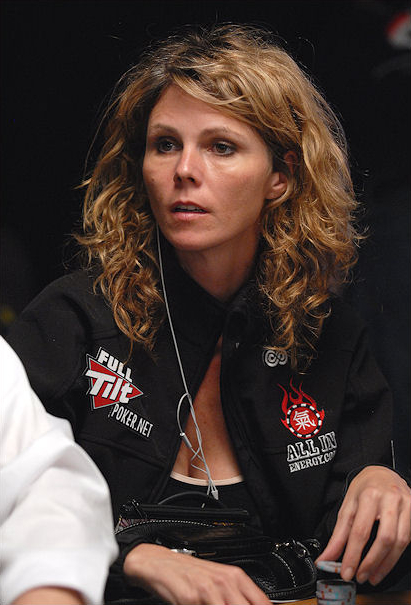
- Clonie Gowen at the 2008 World Series of Poker
- Born: November 6, 1971 (age 55)

World Series of Poker
- Bracelet: None
- Final table: None
- Money finishes: 9
- Highest WSOP Main Event finish: 459th, 2005

World Poker Tour
- Title: 0 (+1)
- Final table: 0 (+1)
- Money finishes: 6 (+1)

Cycalona "Clonie" Gowen (born November 6, 1971) is an American professional poker player, based in Dallas, Texas.

== Early life ==
Gowen was born in Florida, and grew up in Kiowa, Oklahoma. Her first name was inspired by the fact that she was born while a tornado (cyclone) moved through the region. She won Miss Teen McAlester, Oklahoma, at age 15, and as a teenager moved to Corsicana, Texas. She was a member of the varsity basketball team and placed seventh in state high jump.

== Poker ==
Gowen was introduced to poker by her boyfriend's father, and started playing while living in Dallas, driving to Shreveport, Louisiana, on the weekends. She finished tenth in a World Poker Tour (WPT) event in late 2002, before gaining national recognition in 2003, winning the televised WPT Ladies' Night event. Over the next five years, Gowen added ten more top-40 finishes in WPT and World Series of Poker events. She has not been active in tournament events since a high finish in the 2009 Aussie Millions in January 2009.

Gowen served as a guest commentator for the Ultimate Poker Challenge, The Gaming Club World Poker Championship and the 888.com Women's Poker UK Open. She was a regular columnist for All In magazine. She frequently hosted tournaments and charity events and was a partner in a poker school.

In 2007 and 2008, Gowen played in five different episodes/games of the first four seasons of Poker After Dark, a production of gaming company Full Tilt Poker, airing on NBC as a series of televised cash poker games. Gowen won the most money at three of the games and finished with second most in a fourth game. Gowen was an inaugural member of "Team Full Tilt", a group of professional poker players sponsored by, and promoting, the Full Tilt Poker online site. In early November 2008, a few weeks before season five of Poker After Dark began taping, Gowen was released by Full Tilt Poker, and was not invited to the final three seasons of the Poker After Dark series.

In late November 2008, Gowen filed a lawsuit against a company associated with Full Tilt Poker. Filed in a Nevada court against software company Tiltware LLC, the suit sought damages of $40 million for breach of contract regarding a 1% ownership share, among other things. The suit was dismissed by a trial court, but later partly reinstated on appeal—though no final outcome has been publicized as of 2014.

As of 2014, having not returned to tournament play since a few weeks after filing her 2008 lawsuit, Gowen's total live tournament winnings stand at nearly $1,640,000.
