= Kathy Liebert =

American poker player (born 1967)

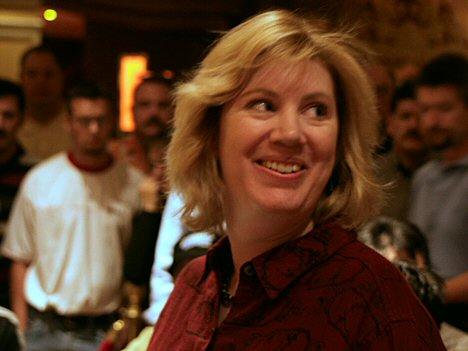
- Liebert at the Festa al Lago World Poker Tour 2004
- Nickname: PokerKat
- Born: Kathleen H. Liebert; October 1, 1967 (age 59); Nashville, Tennessee, U.S.

World Series of Poker
- Bracelet: 1
- Money finishes: 128
- Highest WSOP Main Event finish: 17th, 1998, 2000

World Poker Tour
- Title: None
- Final tables: 6
- Money finishes: 24

European Poker Tour
- Title: None
- Final table: None
- Money finish: 1

Kathleen H. Liebert (born October 1, 1967, in Tennessee) is an American professional poker player.

== Poker career ==
Liebert started her professional poker career as a prop player in Colorado. She would later go on to enter tournaments and she won the first Party Poker Million event in 2002, the first limit poker tournament with a $1 million prize.

She has made six World Poker Tour (WPT) final tables, including a third-place finish in the 2005 Borgata Poker Open, making her the highest finishing woman on the WPT until a runner-up finish by J. J. Liu in the 2007 Bay 101 Shooting Stars tournament. Liebert went on to tie the record at the 2009 Shooting Stars tournament, placing second to Steve Brecher in the longest final table in WPT history. Her record was broken on March 5, 2008, when Van Nguyen became the first woman to win a televised WPT mixed event at the WPT Invitational in Commerce, California.

At the 2004 World Series of Poker, Liebert won a gold bracelet in a $1,500 Limit Texas hold 'em Shootout event. Along with (Cyndy Violette and Annie Duke she was one of three women to win an open event in that year's WSOP. Liebert also appeared on and won the series 2005 Poker Royale: Battle of the Sexes. After being eliminated from the World Speed Poker Open in London in September 2005, Kathy provided commentary on the final table alongside Gary Jones. On June 1, 2008, Liebert made the final table of the $10,000 Pot-Limit Hold'em World Championship at the 2008 World Series of Poker and finished in 3rd place, earning $306,064.

As of April 2025, she has one World Series of Poker (WSOP) bracelet and her total live tournament winnings exceed $7,000,000.

Already a 2010 inductee of the Women in Poker Hall of Fame, in 2022 Liebert was nominated for the Poker Hall of Fame.

Liebert now resides in Las Vegas, Nevada and Downey, California.

World Series of Poker bracelets
Year	Tournament	Prize
2004	$1,500 Limit Hold'em Shootout	$110,180
