= Ted Forrest =

American poker player (born 1964)

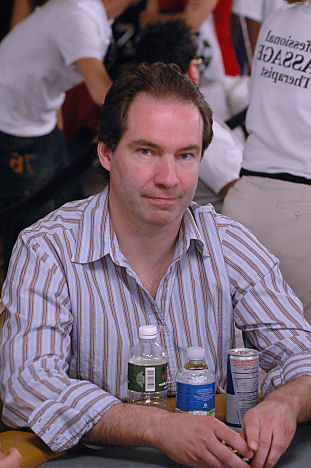
- Forrest at the 2006 World Series of Poker
- Nicknames: Professor Backwards; The Suicide King; The Hitman; Spooky
- Born: September 24, 1964 (age 62); Syracuse, New York, U.S.

World Series of Poker
- Bracelets: 6
- Money finishes: 31
- Highest WSOP Main Event finish: 408th, 2006

World Poker Tour
- Title: 1
- Final tables: 5
- Money finishes: 11

Ted Forrest (born September 24, 1964) is an American professional poker player, currently residing in Las Vegas, Nevada.

== Tournament wins ==
In 1992, Forrest won two tournaments at the LA Poker Classic and one at the World Poker Finals in Mashantucket. Forrest won three bracelets at the 1993 World Series of Poker (WSOP). After the mid-1990s, Forrest turned his attention full-time to cash games. He made a triumphant return to the WSOP by winning two bracelets at the 2004 World Series of Poker. Since then he has moved his focus from seven card stud to hold 'em with some success, including reaching five final tables on the World Poker Tour and winning a championship on the Professional Poker Tour.

Forrest competed in the second season of Poker Superstars Invitational Tournament, where he advanced to the quarter-final stage. He did not fare as well in season three, being mathematically eliminated early in the preliminaries. He played in the first two seasons of the GSN series High Stakes Poker.

In March 2006, Forrest won the annual National Heads-Up Poker Championship, defeating (in order) Erik Seidel, Chad Brown, Ernie Dureck, Sam Farha, Shahram Sheikhan and Chris Ferguson to win the $500,000 first prize.

Continuing with his history of tournament success, in March 2007 Ted won the Bay 101 Shooting Stars Tournament, outlasting J. J. Liu in the longest heads up duel in World Poker Tour history. For the victory, Forrest collected the first prize of $1,100,000.

In June 2014 Ted defeated notable poker player Phil Hellmuth in the final table of the WSOP Razz event, bringing his total number of WSOP bracelets to six.

As of August 7, 2015, his total live tournament winnings exceed $6,200,000. His 31 cashes as the WSOP account for $1,922,990 of those winnings.

== Strategy differentiation ==
Forrest's no-limit Texas hold 'em strategy vastly differs from that of many other established pros who believe that pre-flop one should always raise or fold, Forrest has repeatedly stated and demonstrated in his play, that limping, or simply calling a raise, is not a bad play and should be frequently employed.

== Andy Beal Showdown ==
Forrest is well known as a competitive high-stakes gambler. He has been a key part of a consortium of poker players who pooled their money together to play Texas billionaire Andy Beal in a series of very high limit, heads-up, Texas hold 'em games, with limits ranging anywhere from $20,000/$40,000 to $100,000/$200,000.

== World Series of Poker bracelets ==
Year	Tournament	Prize
1993	$1,500 Seven Card Razz	$78,400
1993	$1,500 Omaha 8 or better	$120,000
1993	$5,000 Seven Card Stud	$114,000
2004	$1,500 Seven Card Stud	$111,440
2004	$1,500 No Limit Hold'em	$300,300
2014	$1,500 Seven Card Razz	$121,196

Forrest's first three bracelets were stolen. He gave one of the remaining two to his daughter; and has the other locked away. Ted also owns one WSOP championship bracelet that formerly belonged to Hamid Dastmalchi, which he purchased from Dastmalchi after the 1992 World Series of Poker world champion complained that the bracelet wasn't worth what the Binion family claimed. Hamid told him, “They say it’s worth $5,000, but I’d take $1,500 for it” to which Forrest replied "Sold" and tossed him three $500 chips.

== Bad check charges ==
In September 2016, Forrest was charged in the Las Vegas Justice Court with two felonies: drawing and passing a check without sufficient funds with the intent to defraud, and theft.
