= Zolotow =

Zolotow is a surname. Notable people with the surname include:

- Charlotte Zolotow (1915–2013), author and poet
- Maurice Zolotow (1913–1991), show business biographer
- Sam Zolotow (1898–1993), theater reporter for The New York Times
- Steve Zolotow (born 1945), professional poker player
