= Dairy Hollow House =

Inn in Arkansas

Coordinates: 36.40968°N 93.73553°W

Restaurant information
- Location: Arkansas, United States

Dairy Hollow House was a country inn and restaurant in the Ozark mountain community of Eureka Springs, Arkansas. Once described as "A kind of Algonquin Round Table of the Ozarks" by The Washington Post, it was co-created by the writer Crescent Dragonwagon and her late husband, the historic preservationist and writer Ned Shank (1956–2000). It was the first such adaptive reuse of an historic property for tourism purposes in the town, which is itself a National Register of Historic Places District. It was also one of the first two bed-and-breakfast inns in the state of Arkansas.

During its eighteen years in business, Dairy Hollow House was named an "Inn of the Year" by both Condé Nast Traveler and USA Today, and was a New York Times "Correspondent's Choice". It was covered in Gourmet, Bon Appetit, Self, The Wall Street Journal, and countless regional publications. CNN filmed a segment of its now-defunct show "On the Menu" there, and ABC's Good Morning America also featured the inn.

Dairy Hollow House opened its doors in 1980 in a small Ozark-vernacular style farmhouse (the Farmhouse), and expanded onto adjacent property in 1986 with the purchase of the more centrally located Main House, at 515 Spring Street, in 1986. Two years later, a full-service restaurant was added to the Main House. In all, Dairy Hollow House served more than 11,000 lodging guests, between the time it opened, and December 1998, when it closed. Notable guests over the years included Bill Clinton, Hillary Clinton (who gave a talk at a fund-raiser for the Arkansas Literacy Council in the restaurant in 1989), feminist Betty Friedan, writers Bobbie Ann Mason, Dee Brown, and Lucian Truscott IV, Helen Walton, widow of Walmart founder Sam Walton, musicians Andy Williams and John P. Hammond, and actress Mercedes McCambridge. Dragonwagon's parents, the writers Maurice Zolotow, a noted Hollywood biographer, and Charlotte Zolotow, a children's book writer and editor, were also regular guests.

The majority of the inn's guests visited from relatively nearby cities: Tulsa, Oklahoma; Dallas, Texas; Little Rock, Arkansas; Springfield, Missouri; and Kansas City, Kansas. Southern Living described Ned Shank as "a fairy godmother, bearded and beaming, brimming with good cheer."

Dragonwagon, who served as executive chef at the restaurant, was called "the Alice Waters of the Ozarks" by The Christian Science Monitor, and was among the first so-called "New American" restaurant chefs nationally, and certainly the first regionally, to voice the preference for fresh, seasonal, local foods, and to work with local farmers. She called her style of cooking "'Nouveau'Zarks", and wrote about it in The Dairy Hollow House Cookbook (1986) and Dairy Hollow House Soup & Bread: A Country Inn Cookbook (1992). The latter was nominated for both the James Beard and International Association of Culinary Professionals Awards. And in 1993, Dragonwagon and Shank prepared and served brunch for 1200 people at the first presidential inauguration of Bill Clinton, in Washington, DC. The event was held at the historic Decatur House.

== The Writers' Colony at Dairy Hollow ==
In 1998, Shank and Dragonwagon began the process of dissolving the inn, to create a non-profit organization called the Writers' Colony at Dairy Hollow. Shank died in late 2000. Though Dragonwagon no longer lives in the area and has frequently told media that her "only connection with it is historical", the organization continues, in altered form.
