= Underground poker =

Games of poker played in unlicensed venues

Underground poker is poker played in a venue not operating in accordance with local gaming laws.

In many jurisdictions, an unlicensed poker game may still be legal if the game is played in a residence, the host does not profit, and/or the buy-in fees do not exceed a certain threshold. Even if the game itself is illegal, in some jurisdictions it is not illegal to just play such a game. In such cases, only the organizers of such games are civilly and/or criminally responsible. The zeal from local law enforcement agencies also varies by location. Often, players and hosts of underground poker games worry more with being targeted for armed robbery than being targeted with legal action.

An underground poker room usually generates revenue by collecting rake or other house fees while not being a licensed gaming operator. Organized crime groups, such as the American Mafia, often host, provide protection for, or are otherwise involved in high-stakes underground poker games. Underground poker venues can also generate revenue by selling food and beverages or by offering side games such as blackjack or craps.

== Canada ==
Under the Criminal Code, any game of poker that is not specifically licensed by the relevant provincial or territorial gaming regulator is covered by either Section 201 or Section 204 of the Code. Section 201(1) makes it an indictable offence for to "(keep) a common gaming house or common betting house" with a maximum penalty of two years' imprisonment, while Section 201(2) makes it a summary offence to be "found, without lawful excuse, in a common gaming house or common betting house" with a maximum penalty of six months' imprisonment and/or a $5,000 fine. On the other hand, Section 204(1)(b) provides that "a private bet between individuals not engaged in any way in the business of betting" is exempt from the provisions of Section 201, and thus is not unlawful. This has been consistently interpreted to mean that a poker game taking place in a dwelling house is legal in Canada, so long as the host is not taking "rake" or otherwise directly profiting from hosting the game. Whether a poker game played on a similar "not for profit" basis somewhere other than a dwelling house (for example, in the warehouse of a small business) also enjoys the exemption of Section 204(1)(b) is disputed.

The laws governing gaming in Canada were written prior to the invention of internet gaming. Notably, Section 201(2) makes no distinction with regards to whether individuals present in an illegal poker room are actually playing poker, while on the other hand there has never been (as of 2013) a prosecution in Canada simply for participating in Internet gaming not licensed in Canada.

The actual penalties imposed for hosting or participating in illegal poker vary widely, and appear to depend greatly on the sensibilities of the presiding judge(s). For example, in 2011 a Winnipeg man (on appeal) won a conditional discharge despite having pleaded guilty to the more serious charge of keeping a common gaming house, meaning he did not get a criminal record. For the less serious charge of being in a common gaming house, discharges (including absolute discharges) are not uncommon, especially if the accused has no prior criminal record. But this is not always the case, for example in 2012 several Sudbury men were fined for the less serious charge of being in a common gaming house, meaning they did get criminal records. Among those fined in that case was at least one man whom the presiding judge acknowledged had not even been playing.

== United Kingdom ==
Under the Gambling Act 2005, commercial high-stakes poker is restricted to licensed casinos. However, the Act and associated Regulations do allow for private games in homes and similarly private venues, such as workplaces, without the need for special licences. Poker may also be played in pubs to a certain extent, although the regulations governing such games are complex.

Nevertheless, illegal games are believed to be widespread, especially in Greater London. In a number of cases, club premises certificates have been withdrawn following allegations of illegal poker.

== United States ==
=== New York ===
Under New York state law, it is unlawful to profit from promoting a poker game without the appropriate gaming licences. Simply playing in such a game is not unlawful.

==== Historical New York clubs ====
Some of the longest operating underground clubs have been in New York City. Two of these, the Diamond Club and the Mayfair Club, were famous proving grounds for such now well-known poker players as Howard Lederer, Erik Seidel and Dan Harrington. The New York Police Department, however, closed these clubs in the summer of 2000 during the Rudolph Giuliani administration's law and order campaign.

==== Recent years ====
Underground poker nevertheless flourished in New York City after the Giuliani busts. In Manhattan, circa 2004, the most well-known clubs included PlayStation near Union Square and New York Players’ Club (NYPC) (sometimes referred to as 72nd Street) on the Upper West Side.

On May 26, 2005, New York City police raided and shut down numerous rooms, including PlayStation and NYPC. Clubs that were not targeted then voluntarily closed their doors for some time in spring 2005, but were mostly reopened by that summer.

The reopened clubs began to draw some celebrity clientele, including Alex Rodriguez of the New York Yankees (who was officially reprimanded for playing in such clubs), and Robert Iler (who was actually present for the October 23, 2005 bust of the club Ace Point at 328 E. 61st Street). Raids continued regularly throughout 2005, closing clubs such as Rounders on West 25th Street in the Flatiron District of Manhattan, and, after a series of busts and re-opens, the Brooklyn Players' Club in Park Slope area of Brooklyn.

Clubs generally continued throughout New York City during 2006 and into 2007, but seemed to the clientele to keep their size smaller to avoid the attention that the larger clubs such as NYPC and PlayStation brought.

However, robberies still remained common throughout 2007. This issue reached a crescendo when the City Limit, at 251 Fifth Avenue in Manhattan, was robbed on November 2, 2007. Frank DeSena of Wayne, NJ was killed in an accidental weapons fire during the armed robbery.

== See also ==
- Gaming law
