= Ante Up =

An ante up is a call in card games for a player or players to put their antes into the pot.

Ante Up may also refer to:

- "Ante Up" (song), a 2000 song by M.O.P.
- Ante Up (film), a 1974 Italian film
- "Ante Up", a song from Funkmaster Flex's The Mix Tape, Vol. IV, 2000
- "Ante Up", a song from Give Blood (Bane album), 2001
- "Ante Up", a song from Killing the Dream's album In Place Apart 2005
- Ante Up, a 2009 album by Scott Sharrard
- Ante Up, a first volume of the comic book, The Losers (Vertigo)
- Ante Up for Africa, charity poker tournament Non-bracelet events at the WSOP
- BJW Ante Up, a 2001 professional wrestling event promoted by Big Japan Pro Wrestling, in collaboration with Combat Zone Wrestling
