= David Steicke =

Australian poker player (born 1962)

- Steicke during a break at the final table of Event #23 of the 39th WSOP, 2008
- Born: 28 October 1962 (age 64); Murray Bridge, South Australia, Australia

World Series of Poker
- Bracelet: None
- Money finishes: 5
- Highest WSOP Main Event finish: None

World Poker Tour
- Title: None
- Final table: None
- Money finish: None

David Paul Steicke (born 28 October 1962 in Murray Bridge, South Australia) is a poker player based in Hong Kong. When the Asia Pacific Poker Tour brought poker to nearby Macau for the first time in November 2007, he placed third in the US$15,000 High Roller no limit Texas hold 'em event, winning US$110,592.

Steicke has gained a reputation as an expert at high roller no limit events. At the 2009 Aussie Millions A$100,000 no limit hold 'em Challenge (Event #8) Steicke earned his biggest career prize of A$1.2 million (US$807,780). David credited his win to a good run of cards but reporters at the event praised his impressive reads and aggressive play, which included a pivotal bluff against Tony Bloom.

In the hand, the flop came K♦ 8♦ 4♠. Steicke's $100,000 bet into a $60,000 pot was called by Bloom. The 6♦ came on the turn. Steicke bet $150,000 and was again called by Bloom. When the 9♦ came on the river, putting 4 diamonds on board, Steicke fired once more with a $200,00 bet. A call was pondered by Bloom, but eventually he folded. Immedlately, Steicke turned over J♣ 10♠ and showed Bloom the bluff. The hand left Steicke in control with $1.4 million in chips, while Bloom was left crippled, having only $400,000 chips remaining. When later asked about the hand, David explained, "Tony Bloom was getting control of the table and in the end it was a bluff … at the time I wasn't really sure. I thought I had the jack of diamonds at first. I guess he laid down top pair, but I've laid down top pair before when there was four to a flush on board."

Steicke had his second biggest win (US$506,260) at the 2011 Epic Poker Main Event, where he finished second in a field of 97. He began heads-up play against Michael McDonald with a small chip lead and one point, had his opponent all-in. However, David's A♣ Q♥ did not improve against McDonald's pocket sixes.

As of 2020, Steicke has amassed $659,293 in winnings at the WSOP. Steicke's live tournament winnings of over $3.8 million place him tenth on the all-time Australia money list.
