= Erik Seidel =

American poker player (born 1959)

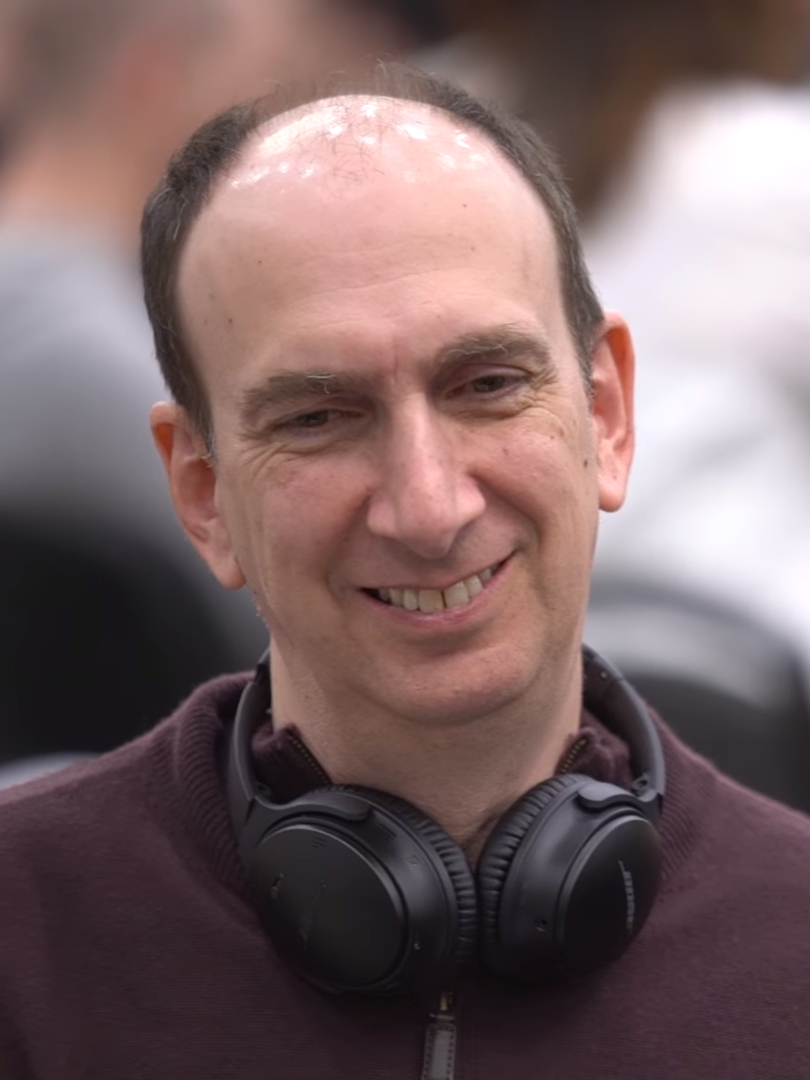
- Seidel in 2018
- Nicknames: Sly, Seiborg
- Born: November 6, 1959 (age 67); New York City, New York, U.S.

World Series of Poker
- Bracelets: 10
- Final tables: 51
- Money finishes: 151
- Highest WSOP Main Event finish: 2nd, 1988

World Poker Tour
- Title: 1
- Final tables: 8
- Money finishes: 26

European Poker Tour
- Title: 1
- Final table: 1
- Money finish: 1

Erik Seidel (born November 6, 1959) is an American professional poker player from Las Vegas, Nevada, who has won ten World Series of Poker bracelets and a World Poker Tour title. In 2010, he was inducted into the Poker Hall of Fame.

== Early life ==
Seidel was born in New York City. He played professional backgammon in his youth. He eventually became a trader on the American stock exchange stock market and later moved on to poker.

Seidel was one of the group of now famous players from the former Mayfair Club in New York City, including Stu Ungar, Jay Heimowitz, Mickey Appleman, Howard Lederer, Jason Lester, Steve Zolotow, Paul Magriel, and Dan Harrington.

== Poker career ==
=== World Series of Poker ===
In his first major poker tournament, Seidel was runner-up in the 1988 World Series of Poker Main Event to Johnny Chan. This final hand was featured in the 1998 movie Rounders. Seidel made the WSOP Main Event final table again in 1999, finishing in fourth place in the event won by Noel Furlong.

Seidel won his first WSOP bracelet in 1992. Seidel has won bracelets in five different games, including Hold'em, Omaha, and Deuce to Seven Draw.

On December 9, 2023, Seidel won his tenth bracelet in the $50,000 Super High Roller at WSOP Paradise (Bahamas) for $1,704,400 to tie Doyle Brunson, Johnny Chan, and Phil Ivey for second most WSOP bracelets all time.

=== World Poker Tour ===
During the sixth season of the World Poker Tour (WPT), Seidel won the 2008 WPT Foxwoods Poker Classic, earning $992,890.

In April 2011, Seidel came just short of winning his second WPT title at the Hollywood Open. He finished as the runner-up and won $155,103.

=== European Poker Tour ===
In May 2015, Seidel won the 2015 European Poker Tour Grand Final €100,000 Super High Roller for €2,015,000.

=== Other poker ventures ===
In January 2007, Seidel finished in second place in the Aussie Millions $100,000 event and took home $550,000(AUD), beaten by Erick Lindgren in Heads-Up play.

In January 2008, Seidel finished in second place in the Aussie Millions $10,000 main event and won $1,000,000(AUD).

In March 2010, Seidel finished in second place in the National Heads-Up Poker Championship and collected $250,000 after a 2–1 loss to Annie Duke in the final.

In January 2011, Seidel finished in fourth place in the PokerStars Caribbean Adventure High Roller Event for $295,960, then went on later that month to take 3rd in a A$100,000 buy-in Aussie Millions tournament for $618,139. Just five days later, Seidel pocketed $2,472,555 when he won the Super High Roller Event at the Aussie Millions.

In February 2011, Seidel won the High Roller Event at the LA Poker Classic for $144,570.

In March 2011, Seidel won the National Heads-Up Poker Championship, defeating 2003 World Champion Chris Moneymaker in the final. The $750,000 he collected for the win moved him into first place on the all-time tournament money list.

In May 2011, Seidel won the $100K Super High Roller event at the WPT World Championship for $1,092,780. He defeated fellow Team Full Tilt member Erick Lindgren heads up for the title.

In August 2011, Seidel finished runner-up to David Rheem in the $20,000 buy-in 6-Max No Limit Hold'em tournament at the inaugural Epic Poker League for $604,330, which brought his earnings for 2011 to over $6.2 million.

Seidel mentored journalist Maria Konnikova, starting in 2016, teaching her poker and the mindset that it requires. Seidel taught Konnikova Texas Hold'em and eventually she participated in tournaments and won $350,000. In 2020, Konnikova published a book about her experience: The Biggest Bluff: How I Learned to Pay Attention, Master Myself, And Win.

=== Career earnings ===
As of December 2023, Seidel's total live tournament winnings exceed $45,500,000, ranking him seventh on the all-time money list.

=== World Series of Poker bracelets ===
Seidel has won ten WSOP bracelets in his storied poker career. His ten bracelets are tied for third all-time, trailing only Phil Hellmuth Jr and Phil Ivey.

Year	Tournament	Prize (US$)
1992	$2,500 Limit Hold'em	$168,000
1993	$2,500 Omaha 8 or Better	$94,000
1994	$5,000 Limit Hold'em	$210,000
1998	$5,000 Deuce to Seven Draw	$132,700
2001	$3,000 No Limit Hold'em	$411,300
2003	$1,500 Pot Limit Omaha	$146,100
2005	$2,000 No Limit Hold'em	$611,795
2007	$5,000 World Championship No-Limit Deuce to Seven Draw Lowball w/rebuys	$538,835
2021 O	$10,000 Super Million$ High Roller	$977,842
2023 P	$50,000 Super High Roller	$1,704,400

An "O" following a year denotes bracelet(s) won during the World Series of Poker Online
A "P" following a year denotes bracelet(s) won during World Series of Poker Paradise

== Personal life ==
Seidel is married and has two daughters, Elian and Jamesin.
