= David Catapano =

American chef, poker player, football coach, and reality television personality

David Catapano is an American celebrity chef, professional poker player, an American football coach and reality television personality. He is known for his mastery in Italian Cuisine and his self-developed "Twisted Mediterranean" style. However, he is most notable for having appeared on a wide variety of cooking TV shows, including the long-running FoodyTV show Italian Style with Chef Catman and Food Network shows such as iron chef and chopped. Over the years he pioneered several catchphrases, including "My Kitchen, My rules!", "Bada Bing!" and "Why, No?" Catapano is an avid poker player and has played professionally and for large charity events. Sometimes billed a Celebrity Poker Player because of his chef profile. For several years Catapano was a successful football coach for Leagues Such as the WPFL, XFL and AFL

== Poker ==
Catapano is a distinguished and successful poker player. Catapano grew up playing poker with his family and friends, learning the game at 9 years old. In his early 20s he established himself in some of New York City's most notorious underground poker clubs, most notably he was a regular at the now defunct Mayfair Club in New York City. Sometimes billed a celebrity poker player because of his celebrity chef Status.

== Television appearances ==
Catapano has appeared on Good day America, The Food Network, Taste This TV, Kara's Healthy Cook Off, The Vegas Snoop, FoodyTV, Poker School, season 17 of Chopped, Iron Chef, WPFL, XFL Football League and more. and has been credited as writer for CSI: NY.

== Football ==
Catapano was the head coach of New York Dazzles, NYC WPFL - Women's Professional Football League for 3 seasons leading them to two Division titles and one Championship. Catapano was also the defensive coordinator and director of player personnel for the XFL's New York/New Jersey Hitmen. The New York/New Jersey Hitmen were an American football team based in East Rutherford, New Jersey. The Hitmen were the members of the Eastern Division of the XFL. The team played their home games in Giants Stadium of the Meadowlands Sports Complex. In the league's first and only year, he commanded the league's best and most feared defense. Famed commentator Jesse Ventura, nicknamed Catapano "The Enforcer" After XFL, Catapano served as director of player personnel for the New York dragons of the Arena Football League in from 2003 to 2004.

== Personal life ==
Catapano was born in Downtown Brooklyn, New York. In 1992, on Easter Sunday, Catapano lost his leg in a train accident in Augusta, Georgia. Since then he has worked with organizations such as Amputee Coalition of America, Poker players Alliance and wounded warrior foundation. Catapano published two books under the pen name Mugsy Russo. He also published several cook books and magazine articles about cooking. Catapano continues to speak and motivate crowds nationwide as a Certified Public Speaker and personal development coach.
