= Non-bracelet events at the WSOP =

Series of poker events

The World Series of Poker bracelet is considered to be the most coveted prize a poker player can win, but in most years there have been competitive events that did not award a bracelet to the winner. While most of these events are charity events or are related to poker, a few are not.

== Tournament of Champions ==
The World Series of Poker Tournament of Champions was an invitational freeroll poker event held from 2004 to 2006. Wins in this event do not count as official WSOP bracelets, but the winner receives a large trophy in the shape of the official World Series of Poker logo.

The 2004 tournament involved ten players with the winner. Annie Duke receiving 2 million dollars. No other positions were paid.

The 2005 tournament was rife with controversy as prior to the event, Harrah's advertised that to qualify a player would need to win any World Series of Poker circuit events or by reaching the final table of the 2005 WSOP $10,000 no limit Texas hold 'em championship event. Despite this qualification, under the pressure of the corporate sponsor Pepsi, Harra's Casino allowed Phil Hellmuth, Doyle Brunson, and Johnny Chan to compete. Mike Matusow won the million dollar prize. World Poker Tour commentator Mike Sexton won the million dollar prize in 2006, defeating a field of 27 players.

In 2010, the Tournament of Champions returned to the WSOP. The event was held on June 27, 2010. Huck Seed won the $500,000 first prize.

== Ante Up for Africa ==
An annual celebrity event was changed in 2007, as it became a pro and celeb event called "Ante Up for Africa", hosted by actor Don Cheadle and poker pro Annie Duke. The 2007 event attracted 167 celebrities and poker stars. The final two players, Dan Shak and Brandon Moran, agreed to share first place and donate all prize money to charities in Darfur. Their actions set a precedent as the 2008 champions, John Hennigan and second-place finisher Michael DeGusta again donated 100% of their winnings to the charity. Jeffrey Pollack, the WSOP commissioner, said, the WSOP was "delighted to once again host Ante Up For Africa at the World Series of Poker” Alex Bolotin won the third annual tournament defeating a final table that included Phil Gordon, Chris Ferguson, Rafe Furst, and Erik Seidel.

== World Series of Rock Paper Scissors ==
Former Celebrity Poker Showdown host and ESPN.com columnist Phil Gordon has hosted an annual $500 World Series of Rock Paper Scissors event in conjunction with the World Series of Poker since 2005. The winner of the WSORPS receives an entry into the WSOP Main Event. The event is an annual fundraiser for the "Cancer Research and Prevention Foundation" via Gordon's charity Bad Beat on Cancer. Poker Player Annie Duke won the Second Annual World Series of Rock Paper Scissors. The tournament is taped by ESPN and highlights are covered during "The Nuts" section of ESPN's WSOP broadcast. 2009 was the fifth year of the tournament.

== All-In Energy Tournament ==
The All-In Energy Tournament was an invitational poker event at the 2008 WSOP for people who 1) purchased 16 cases of All-In Energy drink online, 2) purchased the most drinks during a designated time period, or 3) won an invitation via a sweepstake. The event was officially held and recognized as All-In Energy Drink was an official sponsor of the WSOP.

== Champion of Champions ==
In 2009, a tournament for the WSOP Main Event Champions was introduced for the 40th Anniversary of the WSOP. This tournament was a freeroll wherein the winner won a Corvette and the "Binion's Cup" named after the Binion Family who founded and ran the WSOP for decades. The event was won by 1983 WSOP Champion Tom McEvoy who defeated 2002 World Champion Robert Varkonyi heads-up to win the Binion's Cup.

== Caesars Cup ==
The Caesars Cup is a poker tournament, inspired by golf's Ryder Cup, which pits some of the biggest names in poker from Europe and the Americas against each other in a series of heads-up and team-based poker matches across a single day. The contest is expected to be held annually, with the venue alternating between Europe and North America. The inaugural Caesars Cup took place in London on September 25, 2009, as part of the World Series of Poker Europe (WSOPE). Team Europe beat The Americas 4 to 1.

== Free Million Dollar Game ==
The Million Dollar Game is a tournament sponsored by the WSOPE corporate sponsor Betfair. For 18 weeks leading up to the 2009 WSOPE, Betfair will be holding a series of daily online tournaments. The winners of those events will then play to represent their "region." Prior to the kick off of the 2009 WSOPE, these representatives will compete for the million dollar winner takes all grand prize. WSOP Director of Marketing Ty Stewart said, “Creating an event combining the online and offline poker worlds is sure to create even more excitement for WSOP Europe.”
