= All Falling Down =

1952 Caldecott picture book

- Author: Gene Zion
- Illustrator: Margaret Bloy Graham
- Publisher: Harper
- Publication date: 1951
- Pages: unpaged
- Awards: Caldecott Honor

All Falling Down is a 1951 picture book written by Gene Zion and illustrated by Margaret Bloy Graham. The book depicts objects falling down. It was a recipient of a 1952 Caldecott Honor for its illustrations.
