= Epic Poker League =

Series of poker tournaments

The Epic Poker League was a series of poker tournaments which took place in 2011, organised by Federated Sports + Gaming. Former World Series of Poker commissioner Jeffrey Pollack served as Executive Chairman, professional poker player Annie Duke was Commissioner, and Matt Savage was Tournament Director. The three events held took place at the Palms Casino Resort in Las Vegas, Nevada. Season One received television coverage on CBS and Velocity Network.

The League was exclusionary in that it was only open to poker players who met certain qualification criteria for multimillion-dollar lifetime earnings, multiple wins and/or cashes at high level tournaments, and who were supposed to maintain adherence to a specifically defined Code of Conduct.

On 29 February 2012, Federated Sports + Gaming announced that it had filed for Chapter 11 bankruptcy. The Epic Poker League brand was among the assets acquired by Pinnacle Entertainment, Inc., at a bankruptcy auction in June 2012.

== League Criteria ==
=== Membership Card ===
According to league requirements, players could earn either a 5-year, 3-year, or 2-year membership in the League. Players had to achieve a combination of minimum lifetime earnings (adjusted for inflation) plus a minimum number of titles (overall winner) in major tournaments plus a minimum number of cashes in major tournaments.

Membership Qualification: Minimum Requirements
Length of Membership	Adjusted Lifetime Earnings	+ Major Titles	+ Major Cashes
5 year card	$4,000,000	3	9
3 year card	$2,500,000	1	9
2 year A card	$2,000,000	1	6
2 year B card	$1,250,000	0	9

NOTE: 2 year A and B cards are equal, simply denote the route to the card

=== Non-Member Participation ===
While the Epic Poker League was exclusionary in that it was only open to poker players who met certain qualification criteria, a series of qualifying events were marketed and publicized to the non-member general public, in an effort to draw increased tournament play to the Palms Poker Room. Each tournament series began with a Pro-Am tournament. In addition to the players who have a membership card, the final 9 finishers of each Pro-Am won entry into that tournament's Main Event.

=== Code of Conduct Requirements ===
The Epic Poker League set standards for conduct, dress, and behaviour. Conduct requirements stretched back to 2008 (but no further) when examining a request to obtain - or maintain - membership.

While David Rheem won the first event on August 12, 2011, his membership in the league was placed on probation one week later in light of chronic financial irresponsibility. League rules prohibited membership to any players in violation of state or federal law, as well as players demonstrating chronic financial irresponsibility.

On September 20, 2011, the Epic Poker League voted to suspend the membership of Howard Lederer (brother of league Commissioner Annie Duke) and deny membership to eligible member Chris Ferguson, after the U.S. Justice Department filed a motion to amend a civil complaint, alleging that the two players and other directors of the poker website Full Tilt Poker were running a Ponzi scheme that paid out $444 million of customer money to themselves and the firm's owners. The League stated that it would monitor the legal action to determine any future renewal of membership.

== Event schedule ==
The only season of the Epic Poker League began in August 2011 with the first of a scheduled five tournament series.

The season was scheduled to culminate in a League Championship in February 2012, which was due to feature the top 27 money winners from the first four tournaments. However, the League entered bankruptcy after only the first three events were held, and the fourth tournament and the Championship did not take place.

=== Tournament Series One: $20,000 6-Max No Limit Hold'em ===
- 4-Day Event: August 9-August 12
- Buy-in: $20,000
- Number of Entries: 137
- Total Prize Pool: $3,140,000
- Number of Payouts: 18
- Winning Hand: A♠ K♦

Final Table
Place	Name	Prize
1st	David Rheem	$1,000,000
2nd	Erik Seidel	$604,330
3rd	Jason Mercier	$360,970
4th	Hasan Habib	$237,560
5th	Gavin Smith	$154,260
6th	Huck Seed	$107,980

=== Tournament Series Two: $20,000 8-Max No Limit Hold'em ===
- 4-Day Event: September 6–9
- Buy-in: $20,000
- Number of Entries: 97
- Total Prize Pool: $2,301,200
- Number of Payouts: 12
- Winning Hand: A♦ 4♥

Final Table
Place	Name	Prize
1st	Mike McDonald	$782,410
2nd	David Steicke	$506,260
3rd	Fabrice Soulier	$299,160
4th	Erik Seidel	$184,100
5th	Nam Le	$126,570
6th	Isaac Baron	$92,050
7th	Sean Getzwiller	$69,040
8th	Dutch Boyd	$57,530

=== Tournament Series Three: $20,000 Mix Max No Limit Hold'em ===
- 4-Day Event: December 14–17
- Buy-in: $20,000
- Number of Entries: 100
- Total Prize Pool: $2,360,000
- Number of Payouts: 12
- Winning Hand: A♦ 4♦

Final Table
Place	Name	Prize
1st	Chris Klodnicki	$801,680
2nd	Andrew Lichtenberger	$514,480
3rd	Joe Tehan	$306,800
4th	Michael Mizrachi	$174,460
5th	Scott Clements	$89,680
6th	Noah Schwartz	$89,680
7th	Jason Mercier	$89,680
8th	David Williams	$89,680

=== Tournament Series Four: $20,000 Heads Up No Limit Hold'em ===
- 4-Day Event: Cancelled
- Buy-in: $20,000

=== League Championship: $1,000,000 Freeroll ===
- 2-Day Event: Cancelled
- Buy-in: Freeroll
- Number of Entries: 27 (scheduled)
- Total Prize Pool: $1,000,000

== Bankruptcy ==
On 29 February 2012, Federated Sports + Gaming announced that they had filed for Chapter 11 bankruptcy. At the time of the bankruptcy, the EPL had over $5m in debts to creditors, with financial assets of under $200,000. The majority of the debts were reported as being to Pinnacle Entertainment and All in Production, which were owed around $2m each.

At the time of entering into Chapter 11, both of the commissioners, Jeffrey Pollack and Annie Duke, stressed that the filing was a "reorganisation, not a liquidation," which would allow them to keep both the Epic Poker and GPI score assets. However, this did not happen in practice, and the assets of Federated were sold at a bankruptcy auction in June 2012 to Pinnacle. Subsequent to this, no further EPL events have been planned.
