= Mickey Appleman =

American poker player (born 1945)

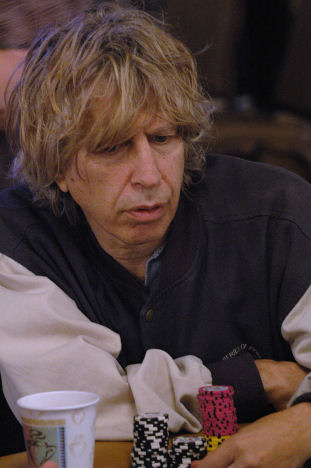
- Mickey Appleman in the 2006 World Series of Poker
- Born: July 15, 1945 (age 81); Brooklyn, New York, U.S.

World Series of Poker
- Bracelets: 4
- Money finishes: 47
- Highest WSOP Main Event finish: 8th, 1987

Mark "Mickey" Appleman (born July 15, 1945) is an American professional poker player, sports bettor, and sports handicapper now living in Fort Lee, New Jersey. His poker accomplishments include winning four WSOP bracelets, all in different variations of poker and four top 25 finishes in the WSOP Main Event.

== Early life ==
Appleman was born on July 15, 1945, in Brooklyn, New York, to parents of Ashkenazi Jewish descent. He grew up in Long Island, where he was strong in both athletics and academics. He received his undergraduate degree in mathematics from Ohio State University, where he was a member of Alpha Epsilon Pi. He also earned an MBA in statistics from Case Western University.

== Career ==
=== Education career ===
Appleman later moved to Washington, D.C., where he worked as a coordinator in a drug rehabilitation clinic. He also taught math in public schools.

=== Poker ===
Appleman used money he had made from sports betting to fund his early poker career, and he began playing at the World Series of Poker (WSOP) in 1975. He made his first WSOP cash in 1977. He was a regular player at the Mayfair Club in New York City, where he played against fellow professional poker players like Dan Harrington, Howard Lederer, and Erik Seidel.

Appleman has won four bracelets at the WSOP.

In his long career as a professional poker player, he has won four bracelets and has finished in the money of the $10,000 no limit hold'em Main Event in 1987 (8th), 1989 (22nd), 1990 (20th), and 2000 (9th).

In 2008, Appleman appeared on NBC's Poker After Dark show in the episode "Mayfair Club." The other players were the former owner of the club, Mike Shictman, and professional poker players Howard Lederer, Dan Harrington, Steve Zolotow, and Jay Heimowitz who won the tournament and the $120,000 cash prize. Appleman finished the tournament in third place.

As of 2022, his total live tournament winnings exceed $1,700,000. His 52 cashes at the WSOP account for $1,239,419 of those winnings.

=== World Series of Poker Bracelets ===
Year	Tournament	Prize (US$)
1980	$1,000 Seven Card Stud Split	$30,800
1992	$5,000 Deuce to Seven Draw	$119,250
1995	$5,000 Limit Hold'em	$234,000
2003	$2,000 Pot Limit Hold'em	$147,280
