= The Storm Book =

1953 Caldecott picture book

- Author: Charlotte Zolotow
- Illustrator: Margaret Bloy Graham
- Publisher: Harper
- Publication date: 1952
- Pages: unpaged
- Awards: Caldecott Honor

The Storm Book is a 1952 picture book written by Charlotte Zolotow and illustrated by Margaret Bloy Graham. The book tells the story of a summer storm from the perspective of a young boy. The book was a recipient of a 1953 Caldecott Honor for its illustrations.
