= The Confidence Game =

Book by Maria Konnikova

- First edition (publ. Viking)
- Author: Maria Konnikova
- Publisher: Viking Press
- Publication date: January 12, 2016
- ISBN: 978-0-525-42741-4

The Confidence Game: Why We Fall for It . . . Every Time is a 2016 non-fiction book by Maria Konnikova. It explains the psychology of con artists and how fraudsters know how to manipulate human emotions.

The Confidence Game received starred reviews from Kirkus Reviews Publishers Weekly. Library Journal also reviewed the book.
