= Harry the Dirty Dog =

1956 picture book by Gene Zion

- First edition cover, designed by Margaret Graham
- Author: Gene Zion
- Illustrator: Margaret Bloy Graham
- Cover artist: Graham
- Language: English, Spanish
- Genre: Children's literature
- Publisher: Harper & Brothers
- Publication date: 1956
- Publication place: United States
- Pages: 32

Harry the Dirty Dog is an American children's picture book written by Gene Zion and illustrated by Margaret Bloy Graham. Originally published in black and white in 1956 by Harper and Row, it was reprinted in 2002 with splashes of color added by the original artist. Based on a 2007 online poll, the National Education Association listed the book as one of its "Teachers' Top 100 Books for Children." The story also spawned an animated short, which was released in 1997.

== Plot ==
Harry is a family dog with white fur and black spots who, disenchanted with taking baths, buries the bathtub scrubber and runs away from home. Harry becomes very dirty after playing in the streets, at the railroad, and in the dog park to the extent that, covered in dirt, he becomes a black dog with white spots. When he returns home, Harry's family does not recognize him. His attempts to get his family to realize that it is him succeed only when he digs up the brush that he had earlier buried. The family collectively gives the strange dog a bath, ultimately recognizing it to be Harry. Soon after, however, Harry hides the scrubbing brush under his pillow.

== Film ==
In 1987, a live action short film based on the book produced by Barr Films was released. It was directed by Peter Matulavich and written by Gene Zion and Matulavich. Harry was played by a Border Collie named Jake. Matulavich directed a sequel, Harry Comes Home, in 1991, which won the Carnegie Medal for Excellence in Children's Video the following year.

Ten years later, in 1997, Weston Woods Studios released another film featuring this character, narrated by Bruce Bayley Johnson

== Reception ==
Harry the Dirty Dog received positive reviews. Kirkus Reviews called it "Another funnybone tickling charmer". Kids' Book Review said, "Its timeless storyline, humour and sheer affection between the characters make the series an absolute delight for all ages." Common Sense Media commented, "Expressive illustrations with old-fashioned charm." The book continues to be held in thousands of libraries worldwide.
