= Home Place (Dragonwagon book) =

Book by Crescent Dragonwagon

- First edition
- Author: Crescent Dragonwagon
- Illustrator: Jerry Pinkney
- Language: English
- Genre: Children's literature, picture book
- Published: 1990 (Macmillan)
- Publication place: USA
- Media type: Print (hardback)
- Pages: 32 (unpaginated)
- ISBN: 9780027331905
- OCLC: 19739875

Home Place is a 1990 book written by Crescent Dragonwagon and illustrated by Jerry Pinkney about a family who comes across the remains of a homestead and a girl who imagines what that family was like.

== Reception ==
Publishers Weekly, in a review of Home Place, wrote "With striking craft, Dragonwagon limns a forgotten family's day-to-day existence. Pinkney's characteristically stunning, limpid watercolors are lush in shades of greens and browns, with touches of vibrant yellow in the flowers." and School Library Journal called it " A wonderfully evocative work."

Home Place has also been reviewed by Booklist, and Kirkus Reviews

It received the 1991 Golden Kite Picture book Award.
