= The Biggest Bluff =

2020 non-fiction book by Maria Konnikova

- First edition
- Author: Maria Konnikova
- Language: English
- Genre: Non-fiction
- Publisher: Penguin Press
- Publication date: 2020

The Biggest Bluff is a book written by Maria Konnikova published by Penguin Press in 2020. Maria is a psychologist, television producer and a Russian-American writer. In this book, Konnikova describes her poker journey from complete novice to poker champ after hiring some of the worlds greatest players (including Erik Seidel) to coach her. In addition to her newfound prowess in poker, Konnikova describes how learning the game helped her with her everyday life, illuminating the fine difference between skill and luck.
