= Annie Duke =

American poker player (born 1965)

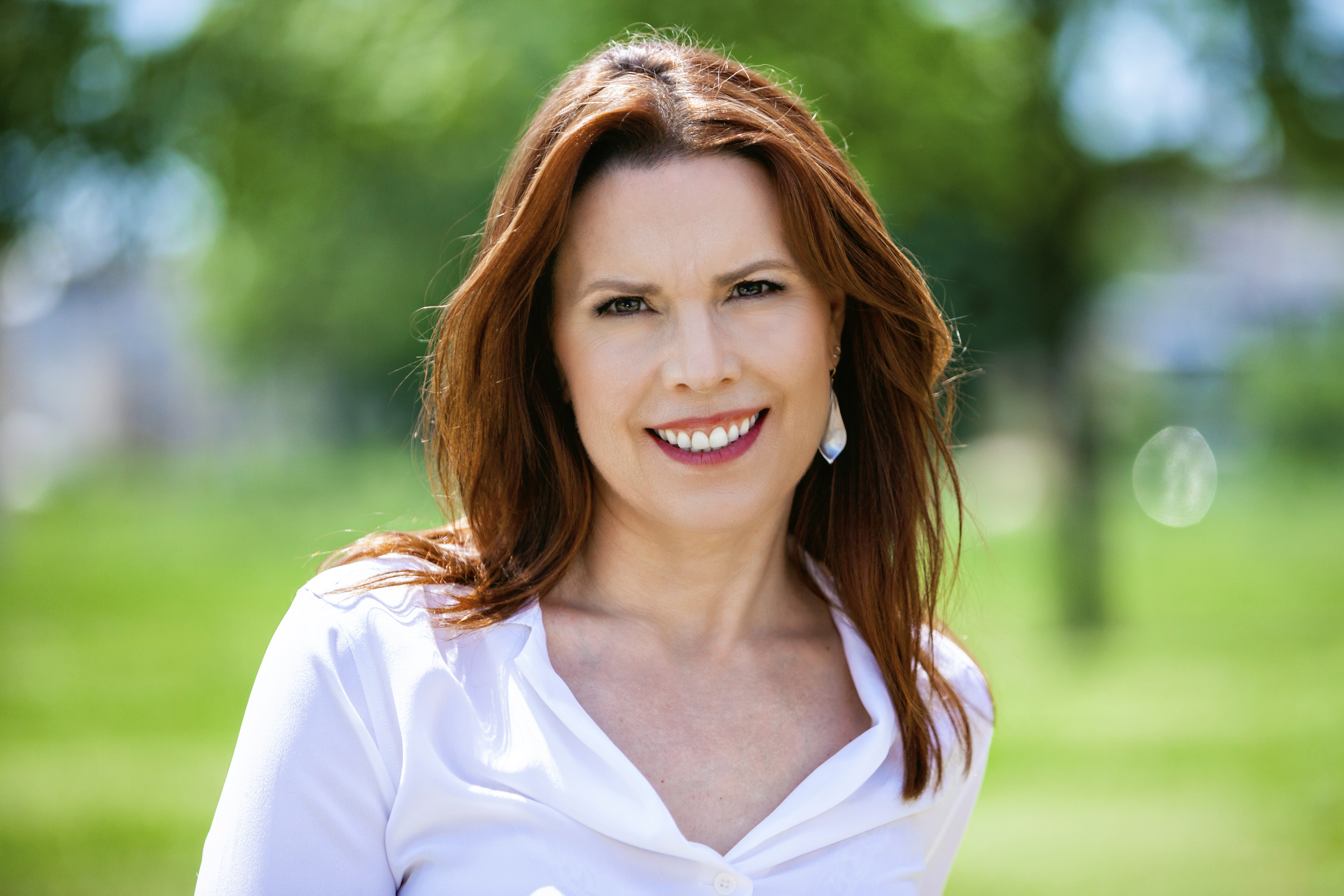
- Duke in 2016
- Nickname: The Duchess of Poker
- Born: Anne LaBarr Lederer; September 13, 1965 (age 61); Concord, New Hampshire, U.S.

World Series of Poker
- Bracelet: 1
- Money finishes: 38
- Highest WSOP Main Event finish: 10th, 2000

World Poker Tour
- Money finishes: 4

Anne LaBarr Duke (née Lederer; born September 13, 1965) is an American former professional poker player and author in cognitive-behavioral decision science and decision education. She holds a World Series of Poker (WSOP) gold bracelet from 2004 and used to be the leading money winner among women in WSOP history; she remains in the top five as of April 2023, despite having retired from poker and last cashing at a tournament in 2010. Duke won the 2004 World Series of Poker Tournament of Champions and the National Heads-Up Poker Championship in 2010. She has written a number of instructional books for poker players, including Decide to Play Great Poker and The Middle Zone, as well as an autobiography, How I Raised, Folded, Bluffed, Flirted, Cursed, and Won Millions at the World Series of Poker, in 2005. Duke authored two books on decision-making, Thinking in Bets: Making Smarter Decisions When You Don't Have All the Facts, and How to Decide: Simple Tools for Making Better Choices.

Duke co-founded the non-profit Ante Up for Africa with actor Don Cheadle in 2007 to benefit charities working in African nations, and has raised money for other charities and non-profits through playing in and hosting charitable poker tournaments. She has been involved in advocacy on a number of poker-related issues including advocating for the legality of online gambling and for players' rights to control their own image. Duke was co-founder, executive vice president, and commissioner of the Epic Poker League from 2011 to 2012.

== Early life and family ==
Duke, born as Anne LaBarr Lederer, grew up in Concord, New Hampshire, where her father, writer and linguist Richard Lederer, taught English literature at St. Paul's School and her mother, Rhoda S. Lederer, daughter of trial attorney Craig Spangenberg, taught at Concord High School. Her parents were both card players and Duke became interested in cards from an early age. Her siblings are professional poker player Howard Lederer and author/poet Katy Lederer, who published a memoir about the Lederer family.

Duke attended St. Paul's School. While a student there, she worked at Kentucky Fried Chicken. She enrolled at Columbia University, joining the first co-ed class in its 230-year history, and pursued a double major in English and psychology. After graduating from Columbia, she pursued a Ph.D. in psychology at the University of Pennsylvania, focusing on cognitive linguistics and writing her dissertation on the hypothesis of syntactic bootstrapping. For her graduate studies she was awarded a National Science Foundation fellowship. In 1991, one month before defending her doctoral dissertation, she decided that she no longer wished to pursue a career in academia and left school.

In 1992, she married Ben Duke, grandson of Ambassador Angier Biddle Duke and a descendent of Washington Duke, and moved to Billings, Montana. The couple divided their time between Las Vegas and Montana between 1992 and 2002, when they moved to Portland, Oregon. They were married until 2004 and had four children. Maud Duke was born in 1995; Leo Duke, in 1998; Lucy Duke, in 2000; and Nell Duke, in 2002. In 2005, Duke and her children relocated to Hollywood Hills, California. She later married Eric Brooks, cofounder of Susquehanna International Group.

More than thirty years after leaving graduate school, she returned to the University of Pennsylvania in the fall of 2022, earning her Ph.D. in cognitive psychology in June 2023. She now serves as an adjunct professor with Harvard Kennedy School and Penn Wharton School of Executive Education.

== Professional poker career ==
=== Early career ===
Duke first played Texas hold'em at age twenty-two in a casino and continued to play for fun in Las Vegas casinos while visiting her brother Howard Lederer during her graduate school years. In 1992, after Duke moved to Billings, her brother encouraged her to play poker professionally, sending her $2,400 and providing her with poker instruction books and lessons by phone. She began to play poker initially at the Crystal Lounge, a local bar in Billings that had a legal poker room. Following a successful year playing in Montana, her brother prompted her to enter tournaments at the 1994 World Series of Poker (WSOP) in Las Vegas. Within the first month, she won $70,000 and decided to move to Las Vegas to pursue a professional poker career.

=== Live poker ===
In the first two tournaments of the 1994 World Series of Poker, Duke placed 14th and 5th, finishing 26th in the Main Event. Following her move to Las Vegas, Duke continued playing poker on a professional basis through the late 1990s, and by 2000 had achieved sixteen in-the-money finishes at WSOP events, prior to the WSOP World Championship event that year.

From 2000 onward, she became well known for her high-profile achievements in WSOP events. In the 2000 WSOP World Championship event, although nine months pregnant with her third child, she placed 10th out of a total of 512 players, which was the second-highest finish by a woman in the event's history. She received a WSOP gold bracelet in 2004, placing first out of 234 entrants in an Omaha Hi-Lo Split tournament. By July of that year she had become the top female money winner in the history of the WSOP, having earned over $650,000 from twenty-five in-the-money finishes, including thirteen appearances at the final table. Later in 2004, she placed first in the inaugural WSOP Tournament of Champions, beating her brother and nine former world championship winners and winning $2 million. In the 2006 WSOP, she was one of only two women left in the tournament when she finished in 88th place with $51,129 in winnings. In 2006, Annie won the second annual World Series of Poker's Rock, Paper Scissors Tournament.

In 2010, Duke won the NBC National Heads-Up Poker Championship; she outlasted a field of sixty-four players, eliminating previous winner Huck Seed and defeating Erik Seidel in the final match. She won $500,000 and became the first and only female winner of the event, which ended in 2013.

In a 2020 interview, Duke described herself as retired from poker, stating she had not played since 2012. Duke's total winnings from her thirty-nine cashes at the WSOP is $1,166,567. As of September 2021, Duke's total lifetime live tournament winnings of $4,270,548 still place her fourth overall on the list of women all-time live tournament winnings..

In July 2025 she came back to poker in the Friday Monster Stack tournament at Commerce Casino in Los Angeles.

==== World Series of Poker Bracelets ====
Year	Tournament	Prize (US$)
2004	$3,000 Omaha High-Low 8/OB	$137,860

=== Online poker activities ===
From 2001 to 2004, Duke worked as a spokesperson and consultant for ieLogic, a company that developed online poker software for multiplayer poker websites including Ultimate Bet. She moved to Portland, Oregon where ieLogic was based in 2002 and remained there until 2005.

=== Ultimate Bet scandal ===
In 2008, poker champion and Ultimate Bet spokesperson Russ Hamilton was found to be using cheating software to see other players' cards, which would ultimately win him millions of dollars. Though Ultimate Bet officials assured users that Hamilton acted alone, later evidence showed that other officials at the site knew about the scheme.

Duke represented Ultimate Bet as a spokesperson until December 2010, when she announced that she was leaving the company. No evidence was presented against Duke and there was no investigation of such with regard to any involvement or benefiting from any fraudulent crimes pertaining to the company.

On two occasions, Duke has testified in Congress on behalf of the Poker Players Alliance regarding the legality of Internet gambling. In 2007, she appeared in front of the House Committee on the Judiciary to testify against the Unlawful Internet Gambling Enforcement Act of 2006, and in 2010, she appeared in front of the House Committee on Financial Services to provide support for H.R. 2267, the Internet Gambling Regulation, Consumer Protection, and Enforcement Act.

In 2013, audio recordings released by Travis Makar proved that Duke knew about the so-called God Mode but did not use it to swindle players as it was on a time delay.

=== Other poker activities ===
==== Debates, advocacy and coaching ====
In addition to her advocacy regarding online gambling on behalf of the Poker Players Alliance, Duke has also been involved in debate about whether players should be allowed to wear the logos of their sponsor companies at televised poker events. In the mid-2000s, she was one of a number of players that argued against such restrictions being placed on players.

In 2006, she was one of seven players who filed a lawsuit against the World Poker Tour (WPT), alleging that the WPT's release forms, required for participation in their events, were anti-competitive and violated individuals' rights to their own image. The suit was settled in 2008, when the WPT agreed to modify the release form.

Duke has opposed and avoided playing at the WSOP Ladies Event, arguing that having a separate WSOP bracelet event for women suggests that there is a difference in intellect between men and women. Duke has supported women in poker through coaching women players at the LIPS (Ladies International Poker Series) Tour, instructing at several women-only World Series of Poker Academy events, and giving the keynote speech at the 2011 Women in Poker Hall of Fame induction ceremony.

She has served on the World Series of Poker Player Advisory Council and has taught at the WSOP Poker Academy poker school. She has coached a number of celebrities on how to play poker, including Matt Damon and Ben Affleck, whom she coached to win the 2004 California State Poker Championship.

==== Books, DVDs and product line ====
Duke's first book was an autobiography titled Annie Duke: How I raised, Folded, Bluffed, Flirted, Cursed, and Won Millions at the World Series of Poker (ISBN 1594630127, 978-1594630125) was published in September 2005. Decide to Play Great Poker, (co-authored with John Vorhaus.) is a strategy book for no-limit hold'em, and was published in June 2011. The following year, Duke and Vorhaus published a second book together, The Middle Zone, which focused on strategy for difficult hands. Thinking in Bets, is a guide to selecting and applying decision strategies in uncertainty, was released in 2018. In addition to her instructional books, Duke released an instructional DVD series including Annie Duke's Advanced Texas Hold'em Secrets: How to Beat the Big Boys and in 2005 she launched a range of poker products with ESPN. In 2020, How to Decide: Simple Tools for Making Better Choices (ISBN 0593418484, 978-0593418482) was released. In 2022 Duke released Quit: The Power of Knowing When to Walk Away (ISBN 0593422996, 978-0593422991).

== Philanthropy ==
Duke cofounded Alliance for Decision Education in 2014. Duke, actor Don Cheadle, and a mutual friend, Norman Epstein, co-founded the non-profit Ante Up for Africa in 2007 to raise money with poker tournaments for charities benefiting African countries. The first tournament in July 2007 was held at the start of the World Series of Poker and raised more than $700,000, which was donated to the ENOUGH Project and the International Rescue Committee. In 2008, 2009 and 2010, money raised in the organization's tournaments was again donated to the ENOUGH Project, and also to Not On Our Watch, Refugees International, Water.org, and the Eastern Congo Initiative.

In 2009, Duke entered the reality television show Celebrity Apprentice to raise money for Refugees International. She finished as a runner up to Joan Rivers and raised more than $700,000 for her chosen charity, over half of the total amount raised by contestants on the show. After the season ended, fans continued to donate to Refugees International and in May 2009 Duke hosted a charity poker tournament at the Hard Rock Hotel and Casino to benefit the charity.

Duke has played in and hosted charitable poker tournaments for organizations including Life Rolls On, the Cystic Fibrosis Foundation, and Boston Children's Hospital, for which she helped to raise $500,000 in 2007 and $425,000 in 2012. She played in a charity poker tournament organized by the Poker Players Alliance in July 2009 to benefit the United Service Organizations and the Walter Reed Army Medical Center and hosted a poker tournament in May 2010 to raise money for After-School All-Stars, a non-profit supporting after-school programs for children from low income families.

From 2007, Duke served as a member of the board of directors for the Decision Education Foundation, a non-profit organization based in Palo Alto, California which provides training for teachers and mentors to produce curricula focused on decision-making skills for their students. As of 2013, she is no longer a member of the board of directors.

In 2014, Annie Duke founded How I Decide, a nonprofit to help young people develop the essential life skills of critical thinking and decision making. In 2016, she joined the board of directors for the Franklin Institute, one of America's oldest museums.

Duke was a co-founder and commissioner of the Epic Poker League, which sponsored three tournaments at the Palms Casino Resort in 2011. Through the three tournaments, the league raised more than $125,000 for charity: $53,000 for humanitarian organization Operation USA; $25,000 for the charity Fallen Heroes USA, which supports families of law enforcement officers who die in service; and $48,000 for the Prevent Cancer Foundation's "Bad Beat on Cancer" campaign.

The league was co-founded by former World Series of Poker commissioner Jeffrey Pollack, operating under Pollack's company Federated Sports + Gaming. After Epic Poker held its first three planned events, the company filed for Chapter 11 bankruptcy protection on February 28, 2012. Filing records show Federated Sports + Gaming owed creditors more than $8 million, while Duke earned at least $299,000 in salary. The Epic Poker League and its parent company were acquired by Pinnacle Entertainment in a June 2012 bankruptcy auction. During 2011, Duke and Eric Faulkner, the CIO of Federated Sports + Gaming, created the Global poker index (GPI). The index ranks the top 300 live tournament poker players each week.

== Other ventures ==
She performed for storytelling organization The Moth, and in January 2013, she was a featured storyteller on the Unchained Tour, a storytelling tour across the Southern United States.

=== Television ===
In the mid-2000s, Duke was a producer and consultant for All In, a pilot television show for NBC based on her life, in which she was portrayed by Janeane Garofalo; the series was not picked up by the network. In the same time period, she also created Annie Duke Takes on the World, a television show on the Game Show Network in which she played poker against amateur players.

She has appeared on a number of television shows, including being the first poker personality to appear on The Colbert Report on January 30, 2006, and finishing in second place in the 2009 season of Celebrity Apprentice. Duke has appeared on Deal or No Deal and 1 vs. 100. On the latter, she answered correctly to 35 questions in a row before she was eliminated. She also reappeared for the "last man standing" game finishing in the final 5.

In 2007, Duke appeared on the premiere episode of the classic poker TV show Poker After Dark on NBC.
