= Crescent Dragonwagon =

American writer (born 1952)

- Born: Ellen Zolotow; November 25, 1952 (age 73); New York City, US
- Occupation: Author
- Spouse(s): Mark Graff (2019–present); Ned Shank (1978–2000, until his death); Mark Parsons (1970–1975)
- Partner: David R. Koff (until his death in 2014)
- Relatives: Charlotte Zolotow (mother); Maurice Zolotow (father); Steve Zolotow (brother)
- Writing career
- Genres: Cookbooks; Children's literature

Crescent Dragonwagon (née Ellen Zolotow; November 25, 1952) is a multigenre writer. She has written fifty books, including two novels, seven cookbooks and culinary memoirs, more than twenty children's books, a biography, and a collection of poetry. In addition, she has written for magazines including The New York Times Book Review, Lear's, Cosmopolitan, McCall's, and The Horn Book.

Dragonwagon was born in New York City and is the daughter of the writers Charlotte and Maurice Zolotow and sister of professional poker player Steve Zolotow. Although many of her cookbooks include non-vegetarian recipes, she has been a vegetarian since the age of 22.

Dragonwagon and her late husband, Ned Shank, owned Dairy Hollow House, a country inn and restaurant in the Ozark Mountain community of Eureka Springs, Arkansas. Dragonwagon later co-founded the non-profit Writers' Colony at Dairy Hollow, and was active in the cultural and literary life of Arkansas throughout the 31 years she lived in the state full-time.

== Awards and nominations ==
Dragonwagon's tenth children's book, Half a Moon and One Whole Star, illustrated by Jerry Pinkney and published in 1986, was the winner of a Coretta Scott King Award, as well as a Reading Rainbow Selection. In 1991, she won Arkansas' Porter Prize.

| Year | Awards and nominations | Book |
|---|---|---|
| 2003 | Won: James Beard Foundation Award: Vegetarian/Healthy Focus | Passionate Vegetarian (2002) |
| 1993 | Nominated: James Beard Foundation Award: Americana | The Dairy Hollow House Soup & Bread: A Country Inn Cookbook (1992) |

== Books ==
=== Biography ===
- Dragonwagon, Crescent (1977). Stevie Wonder. Flash Books. ISBN 0-8256-3908-5.

=== Cookbooks ===
- The Commune Cookbook. Simon & Schuster. 1972. ISBN 0-671-21152-8.
- The Bean Book. Workman Pub. 1972. ISBN 0-911104-16-X.
- Putting Up Stuff for the Cold Time: Canning, Preserving & Pickling for Those New to the Art or Not (1973)
- The Dairy Hollow House Cookbook (1986)
- Dragonwagon, Crescent (1992). Dairy Hollow House Soup & Bread: A Country Inn Cookbook. Workman. ISBN 0-89480-751-X., Nominee, 1993 James Beard Awards, Americana.
- Passionate Vegetarian (2002), Winner, 2003 James Beard Award, Vegetarian/Healthy Focus
- The Cornbread Gospels (2007)
- Bean by Bean: A Cookbook (2011)

=== Children's books ===
- Rainy Day Together (Harper & Row, 1971), as by Ellen Parsons, children's picture book illustrated by Lillian Hoban
- Strawberry Dress Escape (1975),ISBN 0-06-841391-2
- When Light Turns into Night (1975), ISBN 0-06-021740-5
- Wind Rose (1976) ISBN 0-06-021741-3 (with Ronald Himler)
- Will It Be Okay? (1977), ISBN 0-06-021738-3
- Your Owl Friend (1977), ISBN 0-06-021731-6, picture book illus. Ruth Lercher Bornstein
- If You Call My Name (1981), ISBN 0-06-021744-8, picture book illus. David Palladini
- "Katie in the Morning" (1983), ISBN 0-06-021729-4, picture book illus. Betsy A. Day
- I Hate My Brother Harry (1983)
- Always, Always (1984), ISBN 0-02-733080-X
- Coconut (1984) ISBN 0-06-021759-6, picture book illus. Nancy Tafuri
- Alligator Arrived With Apples: A Potluck Alphabet Feast (1985) ISBN 0-7857-0010-2
- Half a Moon and One Whole Star (1986), ISBN 0-689-71415-7, picture book illus. Jerry Pinkney
- This Is the Bread I Baked for Ned (1989), ISBN 0-689-82353-3
- Home Place (1990), ISBN 978-0-027331-905, picture book illus. Jerry Pinkney
- Winter Holding Spring (1990), ISBN 0-02-733122-9
- Alligators and Others All Year Long (1993)
- Annie Flies the Birthday Bike (1993)
- Brass Button (1997)
- Bat in the Dining Room (1997)
- And Then It Rained / And Then the Sun Came Out (2002)
- Sack of Potatoes (2002)
- All the Awake Animals Are Almost Asleep (2012)

=== Novels ===
- The Year It Rained (1985) ISBN 0-02-733110-5
- To Take A Dare (1982) (co-authored with the late Paul Zindel)
