= Mastermind: How to Think Like Sherlock Holmes =

2013 book by Maria Konnikova

- First edition
- Author: Maria Konnikova
- Language: English
- Subject: Critical thinking
- Publisher: Viking
- Publication date: January 3, 2013
- Media type: Print
- Pages: 276
- ISBN: 978-0-670-02657-9
- Followed by: The Confidence Game: Why We Fall For It...Every Time (Viking)

Mastermind: How to Think Like Sherlock Holmes, released January 3, 2013, is a book written by Maria Konnikova. This book explores ways to improve mindfulness, logical thinking and observation using Arthur Conan Doyle's fictional character Sherlock Holmes as an exemplar. Konnikova intertwines her analysis of Holmes's "habits of mind" with findings from the modern-day fields of neuroscience and psychology and offers advice on how to become a more rational thinker.

== Overview ==
In Mastermind, Konnikova uses what she refers to as the Watson System and the Holmes System to categorize and discuss people's habits of mind; their mindfulness and decision-making processes. The Watson System, according to Konnikova, is the more natural of the two: rapid, intuitive, reactionary, and credulous. The Holmes System is slow, methodical, logical, and comprehensive.

Konnikova helps the reader conceptualize acts of memory formation, retention and retrieval by borrowing Holmes's problem-solving metaphor: the brain attic. If the brain is an attic, with finite space, then each bit of information placed there needs to be chosen carefully, organized and stored in a way that is both useful and accessible. "When we are forced to do multiple things at once," Konnikova says, "not only do we perform worse on all of them but our memory decreases and our general well-being suffers a palpable hit."

Konnikova recommends developing "a healthy dose of skepticism", along with inquisitiveness, mindfulness, restraint, and a desire to "look for evidence that both confirms and disconfirms" closely held beliefs. She provides readers with a number of research-based suggestions for increasing self-awareness and emphasizes the need for life-long learning to cultivate "Holmes-style creativity:" practise mental and physical distancing when working out problems (i.e., go for a walk), reduce distractions (i.e., turn off the phone when eating dinner), challenge one's own "built-in reactions and first impressions" to reduce the Watson-like habit of reaching conclusions before all the evidence is in or becoming distracted by superfluous details.

== Reception ==
Konnikova received praise for what one reviewer called the "ingenious delivery system" of using Holmes and Watson to "personify rational and intuitive modes of thought." Reviewers noted that the book uses Holmes-related narratives to illustrate cognitive psychology concepts, and that it includes examples aimed at readers familiar with the Sherlock Holmes stories. Some reviewers point out that, because Holmes is fictional, his problem-solving abilities came from Conan Doyle's construct. It is Holmes, not Watson (who is, largely, portrayed in Mastermind as "unthinking"), that is the key problem solver in the stories, making his "amazing feats of insight," according to one reviewer, a "little too opportunistic." Reviewers found the book to be based in science, though more of a self-help book than an in-depth exploration of the concepts held within it.
