= Mayfair Club =

Defunct cardroom in New York City

- Dissolved: 2000
- Purpose: Gambling, social
- Location: New York City, New York, U.S.

The Mayfair Club was a cardroom in New York City. Originally starting as a bridge and backgammon club, it eventually became "the most touted card club in New York" until its abrupt closing by authorities in 2000. Unlike the other gamehalls in the city, the Mayfair Club kept a low profile in a basement. During the poker era, Mayfair games and tournaments were dealt by the players as opposed to professional dealers in a casino environment. Mayfair Club games were also noted for their high stakes and elite competition.

== Overview ==
The Mayfair Club developed a reputation as a training ground for poker players in the mid-eighties as a result of a small group of elite players who played at the club. In the 1987 World Series of Poker (WSOP), Mayfair Club regulars finished very high in the Main Event. Jay Heimowitz finished in 11th place, Mickey Appleman in 8th, Dan Harrington in 6th, and Howard Lederer in 5th. This strong showing was repeated in the 1988 WSOP when Jay Heimowitz finished in 15th place, and Erik Seidel in 2nd place. Heimowitz had previously finished third in the 1980 WSOP Main Event and sixth in the 1981 rendition. As of January 2009, these five former Mayfair Club players have won a total of 22 WSOP bracelets, four World Poker Tour titles, and numerous other poker accolades. In 1995, Dan Harrington won the WSOP Main Event, and he went on to make the final table of the main event in 2003 and 2004, for a total of four WSOP Main Event final table appearances. They have also written numerous books and articles. The Mayfair was also home court for business executive Wendeen Eolis, the first woman to cash in the Main Event, namely the 1986 rendition. Other famous players such as Noli Francisco, Steve Zolotow, Stu Ungar, David Catapano, Howard Lederer, Erik Seidel, Jason Lester and Paul Magriel became club regulars, too, further enhancing the club's reputation as the premier poker club in New York. Later, the Chesterfield Club in the film Rounders was modeled after the Mayfair Club.

In October 2008, TV show Poker After Dark featured "Mayfair Week" with six prominent players who had their beginnings at the Mayfair Club.

As the state of New York considers poker to be a game of chance, it is legal to play, but illegal for the host to garner a profit. In other words, one can legally play and win, but operating a poker club is illegal. For years, the Mayfair Club and other established underground poker clubs, were an "open secret among law enforcement officials". Prior to 2000, whenever a poker club was closed down by the police, it was due to criminal offenses (usually drugs or weapons). In 2000, Mayor Rudy Giuliani's "Quality of Life" campaign led to the closure of the Mayfair Club and other game halls in New York.

== See also ==
- World Backgammon Federation
