= Steve Zolotow =

American poker player and businessman (born 1945)

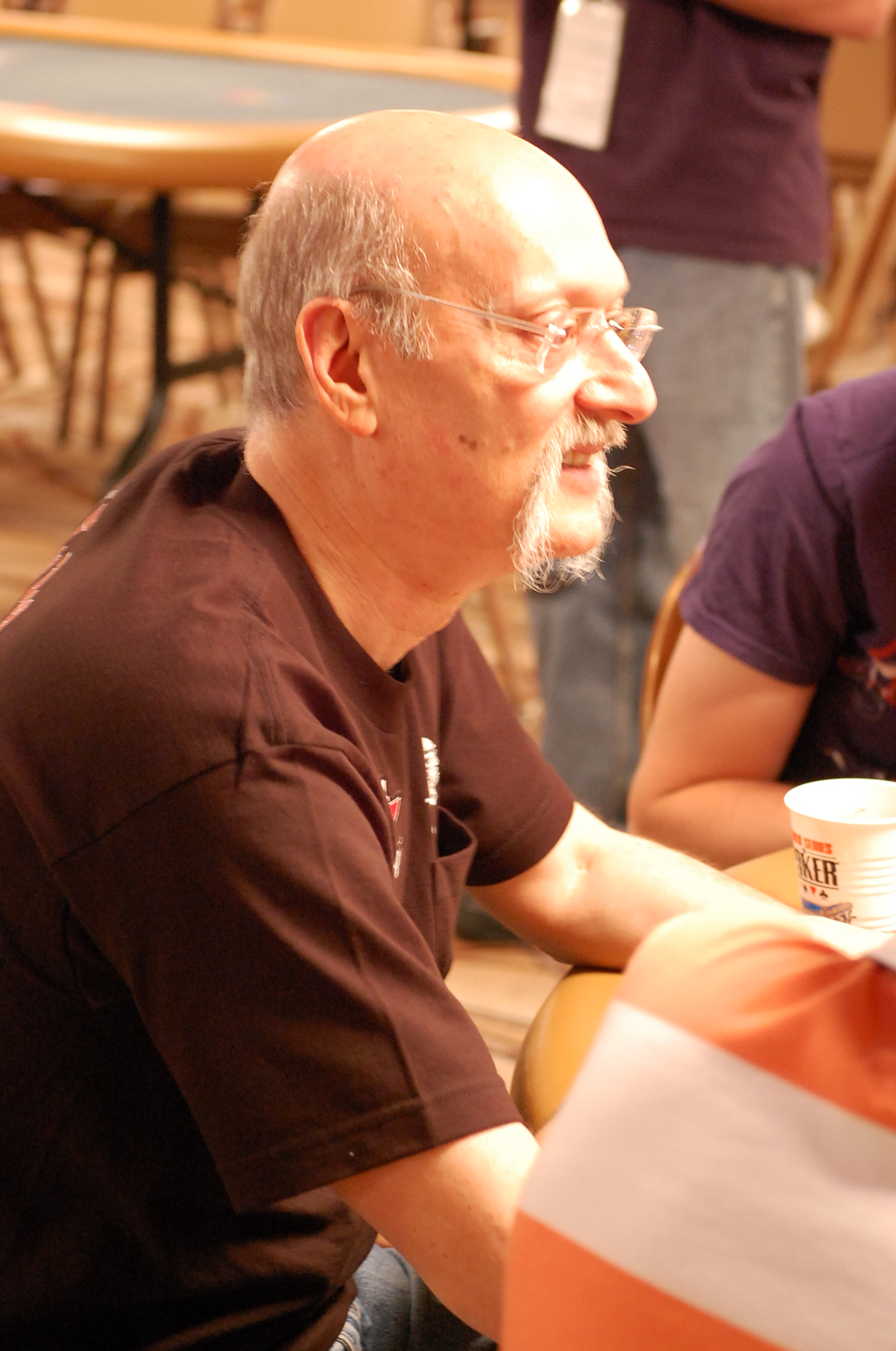
- Zolotow at the 2008 World Series of Poker
- Nicknames: Stevie Z The Bald Eagle; Z
- Born: March 30, 1945 (age 81); New York, New York, U.S.

World Series of Poker
- Bracelets: 2
- Money finishes: 49
- Highest WSOP Main Event finish: 283rd, 2021

World Poker Tour
- Title: None
- Final table: 1
- Money finishes: 10

Steve Zolotow (born March 30, 1945) is an American businessman and professional poker player from Las Vegas, Nevada. He has won two bracelets at the World Series of Poker. He was one of the regulars at the famed Mayfair Club while he lived in New York City.

== New York years ==
Zolotow was born on March 30, 1945, in New York City. Zolotow is the son of the writers Charlotte and Maurice Zolotow and brother of writer Crescent Dragonwagon. He lived in New York City for many years before becoming a professional poker player and moving to Las Vegas. He worked as a businessman, and owns several bars and restaurants in New York City.

He also discovered poker while living in New York and became a regular player at the Mayfair Club along with now well-known poker professionals like Howard Lederer, Dan Harrington, Jay Heimowitz, and Erik Seidel, among others.

== Poker career ==
Zolotow has been on the major poker circuit since the 1980s. From 1985 to 1988, he had five top-nine finishes at the WSOP.

In the years to come, he would earn bracelets for winning the 1995 Chinese Poker tournament (which also featured Doyle Brunson and Howard Lederer), and for winning the 2001 $3000 Pot Limit Hold'em tournament (which also featured John Juanda, Tom McEvoy, Kathy Liebert, Chris Ferguson and Scotty Nguyen.)

Apart from his successes at the World Series, his biggest cash win to date came for a 4th place on the World Poker Tour's Season 2 PartyPoker.com Million Cruise, which saw him sharing a final table with Scotty Nguyen, Barry Greenstein, Daniel Negreanu and eventual winner Erick Lindgren. Zolotow won $259,684 from the tournament's prize pool.

In 2008, Zolotow competed on NBC's Poker After Dark show which reunited six players from the Mayfair Club. The tournament included Zolotow and fellow professional poker players Howard Lederer, Mickey Appleman, Dan Harrington, Jay Heimowitz, and former Mayfair club owner, Mike Shichtman. Zolotow finished in fourth place, and Heimowitz won the tournament and winner-take-all prize of $120,000.

As of 2013, his total live tournament winnings exceed $2,200,000. His 49 cashes at the WSOP account for over $1,100,000 of those winnings.

=== World Series of Poker bracelets ===
Year	Tournament	Prize (US$)
1995	$5,000 Chinese Poker	$112,500
2001	$3,000 Pot Limit Hold'em	$243,335
