= Dan Harrington =

American poker player (born 1945)

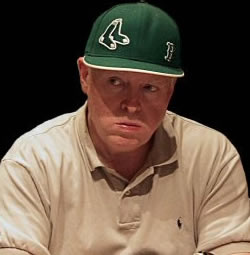
- Harrington at the 2005 World Series of Poker
- Nickname: Action Dan
- Born: December 6, 1945 (age 80); Cambridge, Massachusetts, U.S.

World Series of Poker
- Bracelets: 2
- Final tables: 5
- Money finishes: 15
- Highest WSOP Main Event finish: Winner, 1995

World Poker Tour
- Title: 1
- Final tables: 2
- Money finishes: 8

Dan Harrington (born December 6, 1945) is a professional poker player, best known for winning the Main Event at the 1995 World Series of Poker. He has earned one World Poker Tour title, two WSOP bracelets, and over six million dollars in tournament cashes in his poker career. He is also a member of the Poker Hall of Fame.

Harrington chose his own nickname "Action Dan" even though he is known for being a tight conservative player. He is a distant cousin to both professional golfer Pádraig Harrington and former NFL quarterback Joey Harrington.

== Early life and business career ==
Harrington was born in Cambridge, Massachusetts. Currently residing in Santa Monica, California, Harrington is a former champion backgammon player and U.S. chess master (he won the 1971 Massachusetts State Chess Championship). Before becoming a poker professional and businessman, Harrington worked for many years as a bankruptcy lawyer. He also played poker against Bill Gates while Gates was at Harvard. Some of his earlier poker experience came from the Mayfair Club in the mid-1980s, where he played with Howard Lederer, Steve Zolotow, and Erik Seidel.

In addition to being a successful professional poker player, Harrington also works in real estate and the stock market. Mr. Harrington is a co-founder and former member of the Board of Directors of Anchor Loans, a hard money lender to fix-and-flip and rental property investors that is headquartered in Calabasas, CA. Harrington co-founded the company in 1998 with two poker buddies, Jeff Lipton and Stephen Pollack, and served as its first Chief executive officer. The trio used their poker winnings to provide quick bridge funding to real estate rehabbers. Anchor Loans has since funded more than 5.3 billion in loans and has been profitable every year since its inception. Harrington retired from Anchor Loans in 2010, but remains a shareholder.

== Poker career ==
Harrington first cashed in the World Series of Poker in 1986. The next year, in only his second WSOP cash, Harrington made the final table of the Main Event; he finished in sixth place in the event, which was won by Johnny Chan. Harrington's friend and fellow Mayfair Club member, Howard Lederer was also at this final table, finishing fifth.

Sporting his green Boston Red Sox cap, Dan Harrington is known as a crafty, tight-aggressive player, employing starting hand standards. When he reached the final table at the 1995 Main Event, he set the runner-up, Howard Goldfarb, to bluff for all his chips in the final hand. At the time of his Main event victory, Harrington lived in Downey, California. He won $1,000,000 for his victory. During the event, he proposed a nine-way split of the prize money with the remaining players, but was rebuffed.

Also, in 1995, he won a bracelet in the $2,500 No-Limit Hold'em event for $249,000 and the Seven-card stud event at European Poker Open in London. He made his first final table at the World Poker Tour (WPT) in 2005, winning $620,730 for his second-place finish to Minh Ly in the Doyle Brunson North American Championship.

In the early 2000s, he appeared on an obscure show called “Cash Poker”, where he played a session of $100/$200 No Limit Hold’em.

In 2007, he won the WPT Legends of Poker for a prize of $1,634,865.

In 2008, Harrington made his first appearance on the NBC show Poker After Dark in the episode titled "Mayfair Club." This tournament brought together poker players who had played at the legendary Mayfair Club in New York City. The other players in the tournament with Harrington included professional poker players Lederer, Mickey Appleman, Steve Zolotow, Jay Heimowitz, and Mike Shictman, the owner of the Mayfair Club for many years. Harrington busted out first, finishing in sixth place. The tournament was won by Heimowitz, who defeated Lederer in heads-up play.

His solid play allows him to make it to many final tables at large events. He won the World Series of Poker (WSOP) Main Event in 1995 for $1,000,000. He has made three other Main Event final tables: placing sixth in 1987 for $43,750, third (out of 839 players) in 2003 for $650,000, and fourth (out of 2,576 players) in 2004 for $1,500,000. Because of the increased number of participants, his run of back-to-back Main Event final tables in 2003-04 has been called the greatest accomplishment in World Series history, particularly by ESPN poker announcer Norman Chad. This feat was later matched by Mark Newhouse in 2013 and 2014. As defending champion in 1996, Harrington made another deep run in the Main Event, finishing in 17th place and earning $23,400. He cashed in the 2009 Main Event, finishing in 252nd place for a $32,963 payout.

Harrington, Doyle Brunson, Carlos Mortensen, Scotty Nguyen, Joe Hachem, Michael Mizrachi, and Ryan Riess are the only six people to have won the World Series of Poker Main Event and a World Poker Tour title.

As of 2014, his live tournament winnings exceed $6,600,000, which he accumulated over a period of 34 years, cashing in 52 events. More than half of his live tournament winnings ($3,524,476) have come at the WSOP.

In 2010 Harrington was inducted in to the World Series of Poker Hall of Fame.

== Books ==
He has written (co-authored with Bill Robertie) three popular books on tournament poker, two books on cash no-limit games and one book on online cash no-limit games, all published by Two Plus Two Publishing:

- Harrington on Hold'em: Volume I: Strategic Play ISBN 1-880685-33-7 (2004)
- Harrington on Hold'em: Volume II: The Endgame ISBN 1-880685-35-3 (2005)
- Harrington on Hold'em: Volume III: The Workbook ISBN 1-880685-36-1 (2006)
- Harrington on Cash Games, Volume I: How to Play No-Limit Hold 'em Cash Games ISBN 1-880685-42-6 (2008)
- Harrington on Cash Games, Volume II: How to Play No-Limit Hold 'em Cash Games ISBN 1-880685-43-4 (2008)
- Harrington on Online Cash Games; 6-Max No-Limit Hold 'em ISBN 1-880685-49-3 (2010)
- Harrington on Modern Tournament Poker ISBN 1-880685-56-6 (2014)

== World Series of Poker bracelets ==
Year	Tournament	Prize (US$)
1995	$2,500 No Limit Hold'em	$249,000
1995	$10,000 No Limit Hold'em World Championship	$1,000,000
