= Half a Moon and One Whole Star =

1986 book by Crescent Dragonwagon

- Author: Crescent Dragonwagon
- Illustrator: Jerry Pinkney
- Language: English
- Genre: Children's literature, Poetry, picture book
- Published: 1986 (Macmillan)
- Publication place: USA
- Media type: Print (hardback)
- Pages: 32 (unpaginated)
- ISBN: 9780027331202
- OCLC: 12216017

Half a Moon and One Whole Star is a 1986 book by Crescent Dragonwagon and illustrator Jerry Pinkney about a girl, Susan, who falls asleep in her bed, while the world continues outside.

== Reception ==
Publishers Weekly in a review of Half a Moon and One Whole Star, wrote " Half A Moon and One Whole Star is an exceptional children's book: a work of art, both literary and visual." and School Library Journal called it "a soft symphony of sleep in which participants are both real and imagined."

Kirkus Reviews wrote "The cadence and the sensual images of the text, coupled with the artist's direct, yet subtly disjointed pictures in vivid watery colors, combine for a harmonious nighttime symphony of sound and color."

Half a Moon received the 1987 Coretta Scott King Illustrator Award.
