= Jay Heimowitz =

American poker player (born 1937)

- Born: December 26, 1937 (age 88)

World Series of Poker
- Bracelets: 6
- Money finishes: 37
- Highest WSOP Main Event finish: 3rd, 1980

World Poker Tour
- Title: None
- Final table: None
- Money finishes: 2

Jay B. Heimowitz (born December 26, 1937) is an American poker player from Bethel, New York. Heimowitz was one of the original players to help establish the Mayfair Club as a premier poker house.

Heimowitz was raised on the Lower East Side of Manhattan. His father, Morris, managed a bar and bet on horse racing; his mother, Essie, worked at a book bindery.

Heimowitz started playing poker for baseball cards at the age of 9. He went on to join the U.S. Army; by the time he left the service at age 21, Heimowitz had won approximately $10,000 playing against his fellow servicemen.

Heimowitz used this money to invest in a beer company, which he later sold to Budweiser.

Heimowitz has attended the World Series of Poker (WSOP) since 1975 and has won six bracelets:

== Career highlights ==
Year	Event	Result	Prize	Type
1975	WSOP $5,000 No-Limit Hold'em	1st place — debut WSOP appearance, first bracelet	—	WSOP Bracelet
1980	WSOP Main Event	3rd place — deepest Main Event run, 73-player field	$109,500	Main Event
1981	WSOP Main Event	6th place — second consecutive Main Event final table	—	Main Event
1986	WSOP Limit Hold'em	1st place — second bracelet, a decade after his first	—	WSOP Bracelet
1987–1997	WSOP Main Event (multiple years)	Five top-15 finishes: 11th (1987), 15th (1988), 14th (1989), 11th (1991), 13th (1997)	—	Main Event
1991	WSOP $5,000 Pot-Limit Omaha	1st place — third bracelet, first PLO title	—	WSOP Bracelet
1994	WSOP Pot-Limit Hold'em	1st place — fourth bracelet	—	WSOP Bracelet
2000	WSOP Limit Hold'em	1st place — fifth bracelet	—	WSOP Bracelet
2001	WSOP Seniors Championship	1st place — sixth and final bracelet	—	WSOP Bracelet
2005	WPT World Championship, Bellagio	51st place — first WPT cash	$30,000	WPT Cash
2006	WPT Borgata Winter Poker Open	19th place — second WPT cash	$27,694	WPT Cash
2008	Poker After Dark — "The Mayfair Club" episode	1st place — winner-take-all vs. Harrington, Lederer & Appleman	$120,000	Televised Win

Heimowitz is one of only four players, the other three being Phil Hellmuth, Daniel Negreanu and Billy Baxter, in World Series of Poker history to have won a bracelet in four different decades.

Heimowitz won a Poker After Dark title on his sole appearance, earning $120,000. The show was themed around former Mayfair Club regulars with a table composed of Heimowitz, Mickey Appleman, Dan Harrington, Mike Shichtman, Howard Lederer, and Steve Zolotow.

As of 2019, Heimowitz has made $2,121,439 in live tournament winnings. His 43 cashes at the WSOP account for $1,526,581 of those winnings.
