= Ned Shank =

American writer (1956–2000)

Ned Shank (February 19, 1956 – November 30, 2000) was an American essayist, historic preservationist, and the author of one children's book, The Sanyasin's First Day. He was married to the writer Crescent Dragonwagon, and with her owned Dairy Hollow House, a country inn and restaurant in Eureka Springs, Arkansas. The couple also co-founded the nonprofit Writers' Colony at Dairy Hollow.

A sixth-generation Bay Area native, Shank was born in Oakland, California, but grew up in Ames, Iowa, where he graduated from Ames High School in 1973. He attended Grinnell College, after which he served as an intern at The National Trust for Historic Preservation. He did historical research which guided the 1970s renovation of the Old State House in Little Rock.

He was posthumously made a Paul P. Harris Fellow, and an award was named after him: The Ned Shank Award for Excellence in Publication, given annually by the Historic Preservation Alliance of Arkansas.

The Sanyasin's First Day, a children's book, was published in 1998 (ISBN 0-7614-5055-6).
