= Jeffrey Pollack =

American businessman (born 1965)

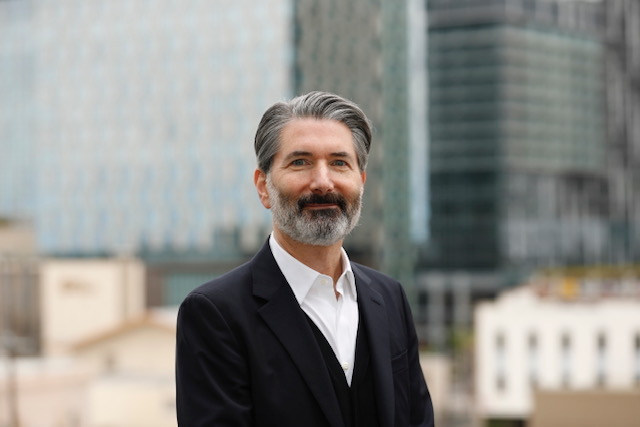
- Pollack in 2019

1st President of the XFL
- In office January 22, 2019 – October 14, 2021
- Preceded by: Position established
- Succeeded by: Russ Brandon

Personal details
- Born: 1965 (age 60–61) New York City, U.S.
- Relatives: Gary Bettman (half-brother)
- Education: Northwestern University; George Washington University; University of Massachusetts Amherst; Harvard University

Jeffrey Pollack (born c. 1965) is an American sports executive and business consultant. After a brief career in politics, Pollack moved into the industry of sports business where he's held executive roles with the NBA, NASCAR, World Series of Poker, Professional Bull Riders, Los Angeles Chargers and XFL.

Pollack was listed as one of Sports Business Journal's "40 Under 40" and was named twice to The Sporting News 100. He has also won two Emmy Awards. Pollack is married, and resides in both Los Angeles and Las Vegas. His half-brother is Gary Bettman, the Commissioner of the National Hockey League.

In 2011, Pollack launched Federated Sports+Gaming (FS+G) and the Epic Poker League. In early 2015, Pollack was hired as special adviser to the former San Diego Chargers. On January 22, 2019, Pollack was named as the President & Chief Operating Officer of the XFL.

== Education and early career ==
Pollack received his undergraduate degree in journalism from Northwestern University, in addition to two master's degrees. The first master's was from The Graduate School of Political Management and his second was in sports management from the University of Massachusetts Amherst. Pollack subsequently attended the six-week Advanced Management Program at Harvard University.

Initially, Pollack's career led into politics. A summer internship with the American Jewish Congress prompted a one-year role with the AJC. He worked as a lobbyist on legislation that would permit religious headwear for active military personnel in noncombat settings. Pollack then relocated to Los Angeles to work for Winner & Associates, a leading political public relations firm. He was assigned to consult the Major Baseball League during the labor strife in the early-1990s. The inception of Pollack's career in sports business occurred in 1992 when he realized—while flying from LA to New York—that there was a niche to fill in the industry.

In February 1994, at the age of 29, Pollack founded The Sports Business Daily. It was the first daily trade publication for the sports industry. Pollack modelled the concept for the Sports Business Daily on the political daily The Hotline. Its primary goal was to "cover the coverage," or aggregate and organize daily news that was related to business of sports Doug Bailey, The Hotline's founder, was Jeffrey Pollack's partner in this venture. Pollack later noted that Bailey's influence was "absolutely critical" to the initial success of The Daily. The Sports Business Daily originally occupied 3 rooms in the same building and initially hired The Hotline's Stephen Bilafer as the Editor-in-Chief. Fellow editor Chuck Todd followed Bilafer in the move from The Hotline to The Daily. Bilafer would go on to note that it would have been a "deal breaker" had Todd not been permitted to join him at the SBD. After assembling a small editorial, marketing and sales team, The Sports Business Daily launched on September 12, 1994 amidst the "perfect storm of business and sports stories." With Pollack as its president and publisher, The Sports Business Daily garnered a strong reputation among decision-makers in the industry. When the time The Sports Business Daily was sold in 1996, it was a "recognized leader in sports industry news and is relied upon by top sports, entertainment, financial, and media executives worldwide." At the time of the sale, The Sports Business Daily provided the content for ESPN's SportsZone "Industry Insider."

Pollack's career with the NBA began when he was hired as a communications consultant for the NBA during its collective bargaining arrangement. Pollack consulted with NBA commissioner David Stern and helped design the relaunch strategy after the NBA lockout in the 1998–99 season. As a result of these activities, Pollack was hired as the Vice President of Marketing & Corporate Communications for the NBA. He remained with the league until 2000.

After a brief stint with a sports website, which Pollack once termed his "reverse MBA", he was hired as the Managing Director of Broadcasting and New Media for NASCAR Digital Entertainment. NASCAR had recently consolidated its media rights and the brand reoriented the way it presented itself to consumer product and global media companies. Pollack helped develop NASCAR's television partnerships with Fox, FX, NBC and TNT and it was under his guidance that NASCAR grew into a major sporting event. At the time, it rose to the "second-most-watched sports franchise on cable TV, behind football." Pollack also encouraged NASCAR to use advanced media and technologies. One of his central innovations was to create an immersive experience for viewers at home. He helped developed the cable TV program, NASCAR iN Car, which involved mounting cameras that could capture the race from inside the cars. Pollack won two Emmy Awards, as a result: the Primetime Emmy for Outstanding Achievement in Interactive Television Programming and a Sports Emmy for Outstanding Innovative Technical Achievement. He was also the first to receive the Billboard Digital Entertainment Award for the best interactive television programming.

== World Series of Poker ==
In 2005, Harrah's Casino hired Pollack as its Vice President of Marketing. While he was officially responsible for Harrah's sports ventures, which included boxing and motor sports, Pollack stated that, "My top priority is to grow the popularity of the World Series of Poker … It is already the No. 1 brand in poker, but we're going to make it even stronger through world-class media partnerships, strategic marketing alliances and superior customer service." By most accounts, he succeeded doing just this. Pollack introduced a range of changes into the WSOP's media relations, player relations, tournament structure and schedule, and expanded into international markets.

His first responsibility with Harrah's was the 2005 World Series of Poker. Poker players' first impression of him centered on the 2005 Tournament of Champions (ToC). The ToC was hyped as a $2.5 million freeroll for which players had to qualify. In 2005, the ToC was sponsored by Pepsi, who was about to start an advertising campaign involving Doyle Brunson, Johnny Chan, and Phil Hellmuth. Pepsi insisted that its three spokesmen take part in the ToC and the WSOP consented. The other players objected that three corporate exemptions were granted at the last moment.

=== WSOP Changes ===
On January 13, 2006 he was promoted to Commissioner of the WSOP. One of his first actions as the commissioner was to work towards avoiding the criticism of the ToC. Pollack started meeting with a group of professional poker players in a monthly council. While the council did not have formal decision-making authority, Pollack stated in 2009 that "we haven't made a meaningful decision about event schedules, structures, rules, et cetera, since 2006 without the input of the Players Advisory Council."

Pollack believed that the success of the WSOP was not determined based upon the number of participants every year, but rather upon the players' experiences. For example, in 2007 the WSOP flattened its award structure. The cash awards were distributed more evenly so that people who went out earlier earned more money, while those who made it to the final table won less.

In an effort to reduce complaints about marked cards, the WSOP entered into a partnership with United States Playing Card Company (USPC). USPC introduced a new "Poker Peek" cards as the official card of the WSOP. New decks were introduced every day at every table. In 2006, Copag provided playing cards that became creased as the events endured, resulting in cards that were essentially marked.

The training of WSOP dealers had also been criticized in past tournaments. In an effort to forestall this criticism, the WSOP began intensive training for dealers as early as March 2007 for over 300 dealers. The training included staff and supervisory training. Part of the reason for this additional training was to prevent a repeat of the "extra chips" that materialized during 2006's main event. During the 2006 main event, the tournament finished with more chips than normal chip upgrading would have led to. Another effort to reduce that risk was the introduction of special chips exclusively for the main event.

In 2008, Pollack revised the tournament's schedule and introduced a four-month break after the finalists had been determined in July. The hiatus was intended to help build suspense and allow the finalists to promote themselves as "poker ambassadors" before play resumed in November. The final two days of play were edited down to a two-hour show and broadcast on ESPN. The resulting finalists were given the nickname "The November Nine".

Pollack also led the tournament's international expansion with WSOP Europe. The first tournament was held in London and hosted by London Clubs International at three casinos: the Fifty, Leicester Square and the Sportsman. Pollack insisted, "The World Series of Poker Europe will have a unique identity, style and flair, but will remain true to the 38-year tradition and heritage of the WSOP." The WSOPE remained in England from 2007 to 2010, was hosted in France from 2010 to 2013 and is expected to be hosted in Berlin in 2015.

=== Marketing ===
Pollack is known for his aggressive marketing. He's noted on several occasions that he's taken the strategies of the major sports brands, i.e. NASCAR, the NBA, and the NFL, and extracted the best practices to grow the WSOP. He has asserted, moreover, that "[s]ports marketing fundamentally is about the selling of hope. Fans have the hope of their favorite team trading for the right player, drafting the right player, winning a game, winning the season, winning the world championship." And furthermore that, "[t]he World Series of Poker offers a brand of hope that is infinitely more accessible" insofar as anyone can enter the tournament and have a chance to play at the final table.

After becoming the Commissioner of the WSOP, he negotiated partnerships with ESPN, Sirius radio, Glu Mobile, Bluff Media, AOL, and Betfair. He also arranged sponsorships with Miller Brewing Company, Planters and Hershey's. In 2006, Card Player Media provided hand-by-hand reporting, streamed player interviews, gave player recaps and displayed real-time chip count on its website.

Pollack believed that the strength in the WSOP lies in its tradition and legacy. He wanted to do more to honor the WSOP's past champions, "I want to bring our past, our history, and our DNA along for the ride."

=== Reception by players ===
Pollack was generally received well by players. Daniel Negreanu was impressed with his first meeting with Pollack, noting that professional poker is "a unique situation, as with the NBA players are being paid, while the poker players actually put up their own money."

On the other hand, Pollack's emphasis on the player's experience along with his effectiveness in growing the WSOP cast him in a good light. This can be seen most clearly through the extent of support he received when he announced his resignation as commissioner. One commentator declared, "the news hit the poker world … like a ton of bricks," and that his tenure in the role "may be unmatched." Well-known players like Phil Hellmuth, Peter Eastgate and Barry Greenstein expressed their esteem for Pollack.

=== Resignation ===
On November 13, 2009, Pollack announced on his Twitter feed that he was resigning as Commissioner. In a separate statement, he commented, "Everything I set out to accomplish in 2005, I think I have accomplished. The World Series of Poker is bigger than ever before. The brand is in a strong position and the player experience is better than it's ever been."

== Epic Poker League ==
In January 2011, Pollack and Annie Duke announced the launch of Federated Sports+Gaming (FS+G), the parent company for the Epic Poker League. Duke served as the league's commissioner. The EPL was designed to showcase the best players in the world and elevate them to the status of leading figures akin to icons in other sports. There was to be 200 players admitted and ranked by a system "driven by mathematics and proven historic achievement." Pollack stated, "I've long believed that the top professional poker players create enormous value for the industry and are skilled in a way that is worthy of star treatment," and moreover that, "[o]ur new league will celebrate poker professionals like never before and provide a tournament experience at the Palms that is first-class at every turn."

The first season of the EPL was slated to include four "rake-free" $20,000 Main Events, in addition to a $1 million Championship Event. The EPL had negotiated 20 hours of television programming. Seven of which were to be aired on CBS and the remaining 13 on Discovery Communications' Velocity network.

The poker league took place in 2011.

== Adviser to the Chargers ==
In early 2015, the then-San Diego Chargers hired Pollack as a special adviser to the team's Chair and President Dean Spanos. Pollack consulted the team on both future revenue growth and the development of a new stadium. Pollack aided Chargers Special Council Mark D. Fabiani in the hiring and identifying of MANICA Architecture, the architects tasked with designing a stadium in Carson, California. The Chargers were ultimately denied the Carson stadium by the NFL and moved into SoFi Stadium with the Los Angeles Rams in 2020.

== XFL ==
On January 22, 2019, Pollack was named as the President & Chief Operating Officer of the XFL.

On March 12, 2020, as a result of the COVID-19 pandemic, the XFL was forced to cancel its season after only five games had been played. Pollack announced, "We were on track to be the most successful launch of a new sports league in decades, if not ever, and we are hopeful the XFL can resume that trajectory with a new owner, for the fans and players and for the love of football."

On April 10, 2020, Pollack announced in a conference call with the employees that the league was suspending operations and all employees would be laid off. Three days later, due to the COVID-19 pandemic, the XFL filed for Chapter 11 bankruptcy protection and Pollack stated that "The league will aim to use its bankruptcy to sell off assets, the most significant of which are the XFL brand, trademarks, and intellectual property like its slogan, 'For the Love of Football.'"

On August 2, 2020, Dwayne Johnson, Dany Garcia, and RedBird Capital Partners purchased the league for $15 million followed by the court approval five days later.

On March 10, 2021, Pollack, XFL owner Dany Garcia and CFL commissioner Randy Ambrosie announced that XFL and CFL have agreed to work together following conversations by both sides seeking a potential collaboration, saying, "We are honored and excited to be in discussions with the CFL. It's clear through our early conversations that we share a passion for football, an expansive sense of possibility, and a deep desire to create more opportunity for players and fans across North America and around the world," and continued, "Blending the CFL's rich heritage with our fresh thinking, and the unique reach and experience of our ownership, could be transformative for the game."

On October 14, 2021, it was reported that Pollack had left the XFL. Details of his departure were unknown at the time of the report.
