= Michael McDonald (poker player) =

Canadian poker player (born 1989)

Mike McDonald
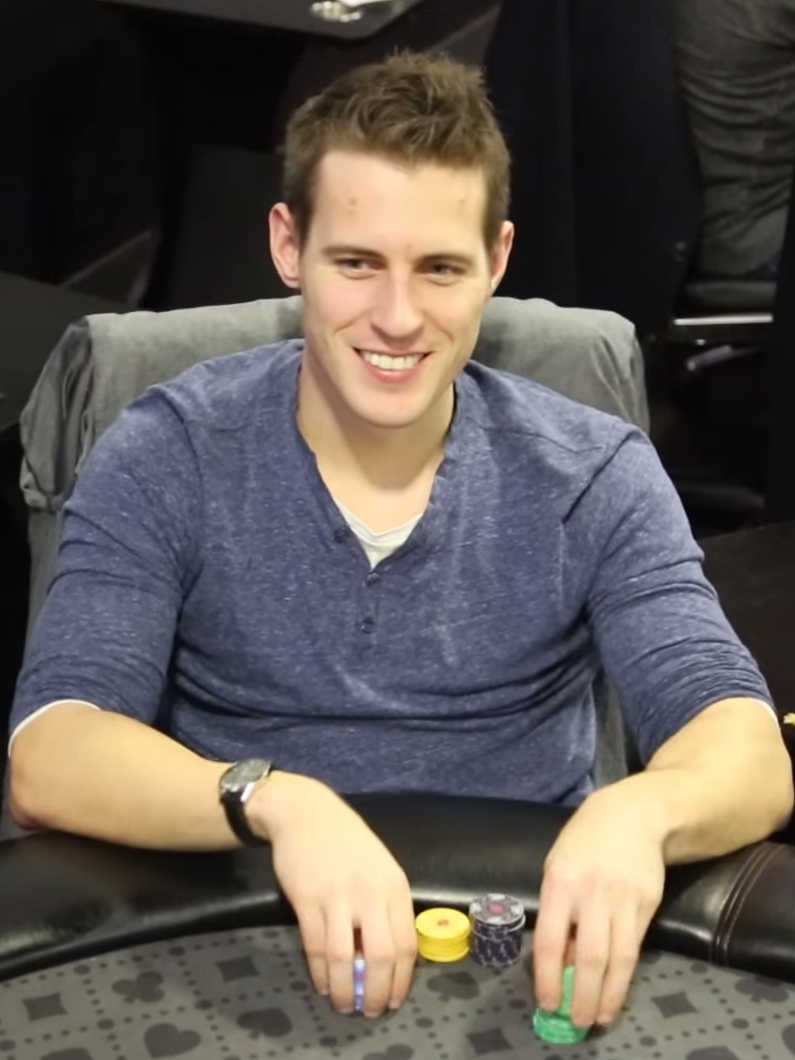
- Mike McDonald in 2015
- Nickname: Tîmex
- Born: September 11, 1989 (age 37)

World Series of Poker
- Bracelet: None
- Final table: 1
- Money finishes: 9

World Poker Tour
- Title: None
- Final table: 1
- Money finishes: 3

European Poker Tour
- Title: 1
- Final tables: 5
- Money finishes: 10

Mike McDonald (born September 11, 1989) is a Canadian poker player. McDonald is the youngest person to win an event on the European Poker Tour (EPT) and the youngest person to win an event on the Epic Poker League (EPL).

At 18 years of age, McDonald won the EPT German Open in Dortmund, Germany in February 2008 winning €933,600 ($1,370,161). Earlier in January the same year, he also won the A$1,000 PokerPro No Limit Hold'em preliminary event at the Aussie Millions and came runner up in another preliminary event.

He has had numerous other notable finishes including a 5th-place finish in Dortmund in 2009, and a 3rd-place finish in Deauville on the European Poker Tour, as well as a 4th-place finish in Venice in 2009 on the World Poker Tour and a 6th-place finish in the $5,000 Pot Limit Omaha Six Handed event at the World Series of Poker.

In September 2011, McDonald won the $20,000 buy-in 8-max No Limit Hold'em tournament at the Epic Poker League earning over $780,000.

McDonald finished in 2nd place at the 2014 Pokerstars Caribbean Adventure main event, earning just over $1,000,000 and narrowly missing out on becoming the first player to have two EPT titles.

As of 2022, his total live tournament winnings exceed $13,300,000.
