= Charlotte Zolotow =

American writer, poet, editor and publisher of children's books

- Born: Charlotte Gertrude Shapiro; June 26, 1915; Norfolk, Virginia, U.S.
- Died: November 19, 2013 (aged 98); Hastings-on-Hudson, New York, U.S.
- Occupations: Editor, writer
- Spouse: Maurice Zolotow (m. 1938; div. 1969)
- Children: Steve and Crescent
- Writing career
- Genres: Children's picture books, poetry
- Website: charlottezolotow.com

Charlotte Zolotow (born Charlotte Gertrude Shapiro; June 26, 1915 – November 19, 2013) was an American writer, poet, editor, and publisher of many books for children. She wrote about 70 picture book texts. (Note: Publisher HarperCollins credits her with more than 70 "books for young audiences" and the UW Madison Children's Book Center (CCBC) with more than 70 "picture book texts". CCBC lists 69 titles by Zolotow under the "Picture Books" heading.)

The writers she edited include Paul Fleischman, Paul Zindel, Mary Rodgers, Robert Lipsyte, and Francesca Lia Block.

== Life ==
Zolotow was born in Norfolk, Virginia. She studied writing with Helen C. White at the University of Wisconsin Madison from 1933 to 1936 and then moved to New York City, where she started at Harper & Bros as secretary to the children's books editor Ursula Nordstrom. She was married to Maurice Zolotow from 1938 until their divorce in 1969. Their daughter Ellen is writer Crescent Dragonwagon and their son is poker tournament champion Steve Zolotow. She lived in Hastings-on-Hudson, New York, where she died, aged 98.

== Work ==
Zolotow's work was published by more than 20 different houses. She was an editor, and later publisher, at Harper & Row (which was called Harper & Brothers when she began to work there, and is now known as HarperCollins). The poem "Missing You" from River Winding appears in Best Friends, a collection of poems, and "People" from All That Sunlight appears in the collection More Surprises (both of these anthologies bear the emblem, "A Charlotte Zolotow Book"). She contributed a story called Enemies, illustrated by Ben Shecter, to The Big Book for Peace where she appears alongside other well-known authors and illustrators including Lloyd Alexander, Steven Kellogg and Trina Schart Hyman.

One of Zolotow's titles most widely held in WorldCat libraries is When the Wind Stops, a picture book edited by Ursula Nordstrom and published in 1962 with illustrations by Joe Lasker. Subsequent editions were illustrated by Howard Knotts (1975) and Stefano Vitale (1995, a revised edition). In June 2014, the Children's Literature Association named the latter a runner-up for the Phoenix Picture Book Award, which annually recognizes a picture book with lasting value that did not win a major award 20 years earlier. "Books are considered not only for the quality of their illustrations, but for the way pictures and text work together."

Zolotow's 1972 book William's Doll (illustrated by William Pène du Bois), about gender stereotypes, was adapted by composer Mary Rodgers and lyricist Sheldon Harnick for the children's album Free to Be ... You and Me, and then for the subsequent television special.

In 1998, the Cooperative Children's Book Center at UW Madison School of Education (CCBC) inaugurated the Charlotte Zolotow Award, "given annually to the author of the best picture book text published in the United States in the preceding year". (The American Library Association Caldecott Medal is given to the illustrator of an American children's picture book.)

== Selected books ==
Some of Zolotow's picture book writings were revised and several were illustrated more than once. At least two titles (both listed here) were published in three editions with three illustrators.

- The Park Book, illustrated by H. A. Rey (1944)
- The Storm Book, illus. Margaret Bloy Graham (1952)
- The City Boy and the Country Horse, written as Charlotte Bookman, illus. William Moyers (Treasure Books, 1952)
- Do You Know What I'll Do?, illus. Garth Williams (Harper, 1958); illus. Javaka Steptoe (HarperCollins, 2000)
- Over and Over, illus. Garth Williams (Harper, 1957 and 1985)
- The Bunny Who Found Easter, illus. Betty Peterson (Berkeley, California: Parnassus Press, 1959); illus. Helen Craig (Houghton Mifflin, 1998) – LCCN 97-36827 with publisher description
- When the Wind Stops, illus. Joe Lasker (Abelard-Schuman, 1962); illus. Howard Knotts (Harper & Row, 1975); revised edition, newly illustrated by Stephan Vitale (HarperCollins, 1995)
- Mr. Rabbit and the Lovely Present, illus. Maurice Sendak (1963)
- If It Weren't for You, illus. Ben Shecter (1966)
- Some Things Go Together, couplets by Zolotow, illus. Sylvie Selig (Abelard-Shuman, 1969); illus. Karen Gundersheimer (Crowell, 1983), illus. Ashley Wolff (HarperCollins, 1999)
- River Winding, poems by Zolotow, illus. Regina Sherkerjian (Abelard-Schuman, 1970); illus. Kazue Mizumura (Crowell, 1978)
- Where I Begin, written as Sarah Abbott, illus. Rocco Negri (Coward-McCann, 1970)
- The Beautiful Christmas Tree, illus. Ruth Robbins (Parnassus, 1972); illus. Yan Nascimbene (Houghton Mifflin, 1999)
- The Old Dog, written as Sarah Abbott, illus. George Mocniak (Coward-McCann, 1972); revised edition, newly illus. James Ransome (HarperCollins, 1995) – LCCN 93-41081 with publisher description
- William's Doll, illus. William Pène du Bois (1972)
- My Grandson Lew, illus. William Pène du Bois (1974)
- I Know a Lady, illus. James Stevenson (1984)
- The Big Book for Peace, illus. Ben Shecter (Dutton, 1990)
- Snippets: A Gathering of Poems, Pictures, and Possibilities, illus. Melissa Sweet (HarperCollins, 1993)
- Who is Ben?, illus. Kathryn Jacobi (HarperCollins, 1997)
