= Maurice Zolotow =

American writer (1913–1991)

- Born: 23 November 1913; United States
- Died: March 14, 1991 (aged 77)
- Spouse: Charlotte Shapiro (m. 1938; div. 1969)
- Children: Steve and Crescent
- Writing career
- Genre: Biography

Maurice Zolotow (November 23, 1913 – March 14, 1991) was an American show business biographer. He wrote books and magazine articles. His articles appeared in publications including Life, Collier's Weekly, Reader's Digest, Look, Los Angeles, and many others. His book Marilyn Monroe was the first written on the iconic actress and the only one published during her lifetime.

Zolotow attended the University of Wisconsin–Madison, where he met his future wife, Charlotte Shapiro. In 1936, after graduation, Zolotow took a job at Billboard, then a publication covering not just the music business, but all aspects of show business. There he wrote a gossip column called "The Broadway Beat." Zolotow was an early jazz lover and gave Duke Ellington his first national review. Zolotow remained devoted to pop culture, literature (one of his closest friends was poet Delmore Schwartz), politics, and magic. As a child, Zolotow recalled seeing Harry Houdini perform at Coney Island and based his novel, The Great Balsamo, on the famous magician. In later life, Zolotow befriended contemporary magician Ricky Jay.

Strangely enough, one of Zolotow's first books, published only in London in 1948, was about Dr. Maurice William, a Ukrainian-born New York dentist and former Socialist, whose 1920 critique of Marxist economics had supposedly influenced Chinese statesman Sun Yat-sen, shortly before his death, to rethink his earlier sympathy for Communism.

Other biographies by Zolotow include Shooting Star, about John Wayne, Stagestruck: The Romance of Alfred Lunt and Lynn Fontanne, concerning the husband and wife Broadway legends, and Billy Wilder in Hollywood, about the Oscar-winning director and screenwriter. He also wrote shorter celebrity profiles on such entertainers as Tallulah Bankhead, Walter Matthau, Grace Kelly, and Milton Berle. A collection of Zolotow's profiles was published in 1951 as No People Like Show People, including pieces on Jimmy Durante, Jack Benny, Oscar Levant, Frank Fay, Fred Allen, Ethel Merman, Jed Harris, as well as Bankhead and Berle.

Zolotow also wrote occasionally on food and alcohol, including several articles on the latter for Playboy. His 1971 piece on absinthe has been widely reprinted. His book, Confessions of a Race Track Fiend, describes Zolotow's own experiences playing the horses at Southern California tracks.

He lived in Hastings-on-Hudson, New York, for much of his adult life, but moved to Los Angeles, California, after his divorce. He had two children, poker enthusiast Steve Zolotow and author Crescent Dragonwagon. His former wife, to whom he was married from 1938 to 1969, was children's author and editor Charlotte Zolotow.

== Works ==
- Zolotow, Maurice (1945-11-10). "The Man who Astonished Hattiesburg". The Saturday Evening Post.

Earl Melvin Finch (December 5, 1915 - August 25, 1965): The One Man U.S.O.

- Zolotow, Maurice (1948-06-13). "Maurice William and Sun Yat-sen". R. Hale – via Google Books.
- Zolotow, Maurice (1951-06-13). "No People Like Show People". Random House – via Google Books.
- Zolotow, Maurice (1953-06-13). "It Takes All Kinds: Some Actors and Eccentrics". W.H. Allen – via Google Books.
- Zolotow, Maurice (1954-06-13). "The Great Balsamo". Pyramid Books – via Google Books.
- Zolotow, Maurice (1959-06-13). "Oh Careless Love". Harcourt, Brace – via Google Books.
- Zolotow, Maurice (1962-06-13). "Marilyn Monroe, Etc. [With Portraits.]". Hamilton & Company (Stafford) – via Google Books.
- Zolotow, Maurice (1965-06-13). "Stagestruck: The Romance of Alfred Lunt and Lynn Fontanne". Harcourt, Brace & World – via Google Books.
- Zolotow, Maurice (1974-06-13). "Shooting Star: The Life and Adventures of John Wayne". Simon and Schuster – via Google Books.
- Zolotow, Maurice (1987-06-13). Billy Wilder in Hollywood. Hal Leonard Corporation. ISBN 9780879100704 – via Google Books.
- Zolotow, Maurice (1983). Confessions of a Racetrack Fiend, Or, How To, Pick a 6, and My Other Secrets of Handicapping for the Weekend Horseplayer. St. Martin's Press. ISBN 9780312162207 – via books.google.com.
- Zolotow, Maurice (1978). "Through a Shot Glass, Darkly" – via books.google.com.
- Zolotow, Maurice. "The Most Exclusive Hobby in the World" – via books.google.com.
- Zolotow, Maurice (1944). "Never Whistle in a Dressing Room; Or, Breakfast in Bedlam" – via books.google.com.
