= Maria Konnikova =

Russian-American writer and psychologist

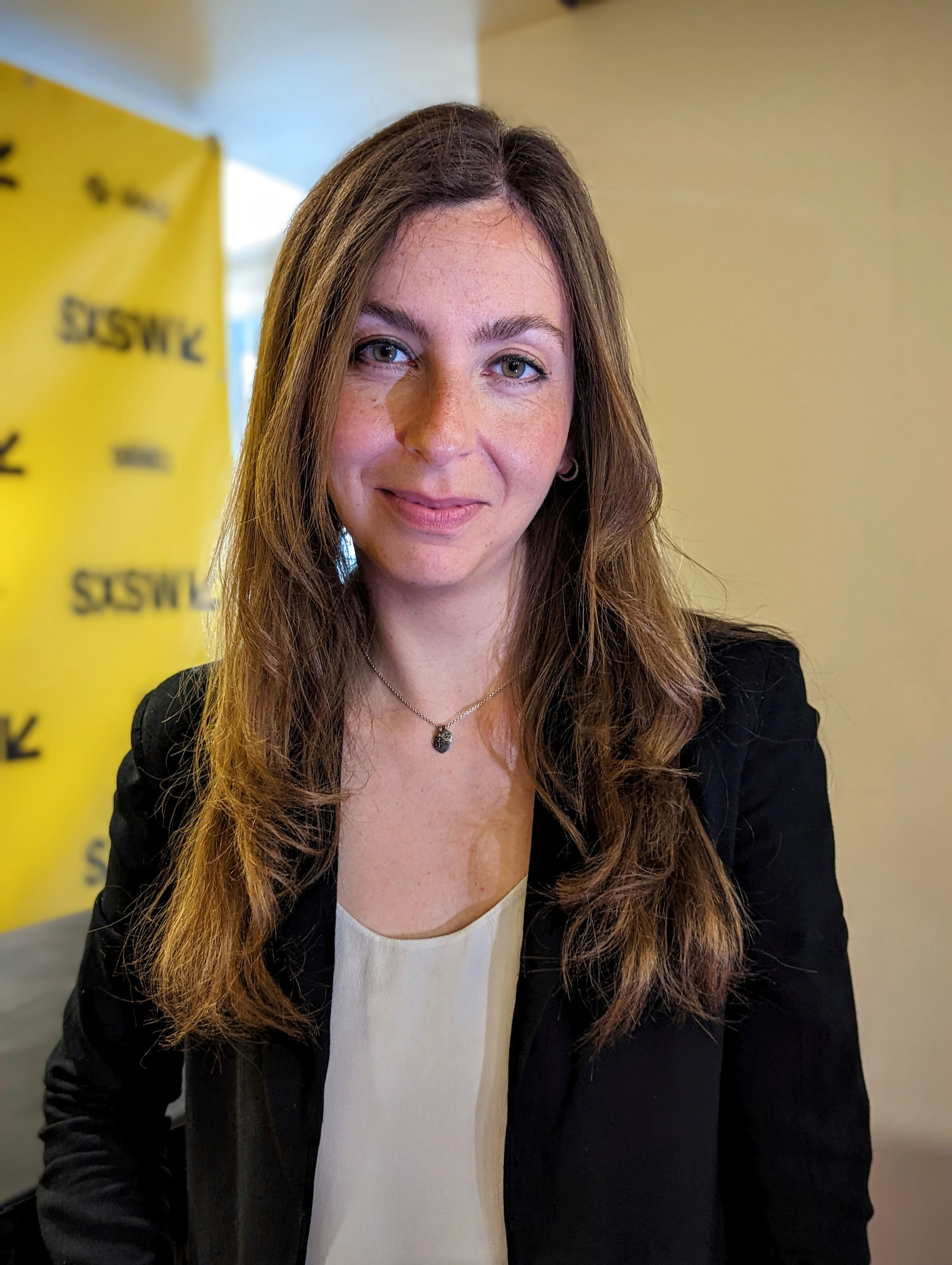
- Konnikova at SXSW 2022
- Born: 1984 (age 41–42); Moscow, Soviet Union
- Education: Harvard University (BA); Columbia University (PhD)
- Occupations: Author; psychologist (sport); poker player; social scientist
- Writing career
- Genres: Popular science; Psychology
- Notable works: The Biggest Bluff; Mastermind: How to Think Like Sherlock Holmes; The Confidence Game
- Scientific career
- Thesis: The Limits of Self-Control: Self-Control, Illusory Control, and Risky Financial Decision Making (2013)
- Doctoral advisor: Walter Mischel
- Website: www.mariakonnikova.com

Maria Konnikova (born 1984) is an American writer. Konnikova has also worked as a television producer, poker player, and podcaster. She has written three New York Times bestseller list books, including Mastermind: How to Think Like Sherlock Holmes.

== Biography ==
=== Early life and education ===
Maria Konnikova was born in Moscow, Russia. Her family emigrated to the United States and settled in Massachusetts when she was four years old.

Konnikova attended Acton-Boxborough Regional High School in Massachusetts. After graduating from high school she attended Harvard University and graduated with a B.A. in psychology and creative writing where she was mentored by Steven Pinker. She earned a Ph.D. in psychology from Columbia University in 2013 under Walter Mischel.

=== Writing and media ===
Konnikova worked as a producer for the Charlie Rose Show, where she helped to set up the segment "Brain Series." She wrote the "Literally Psyched" column for Scientific American and the psychology blog "Artful Choice" for Big Think. In April 2013, her article on uncertainty in decision-making was published in The New Yorker, to which she continues to contribute.

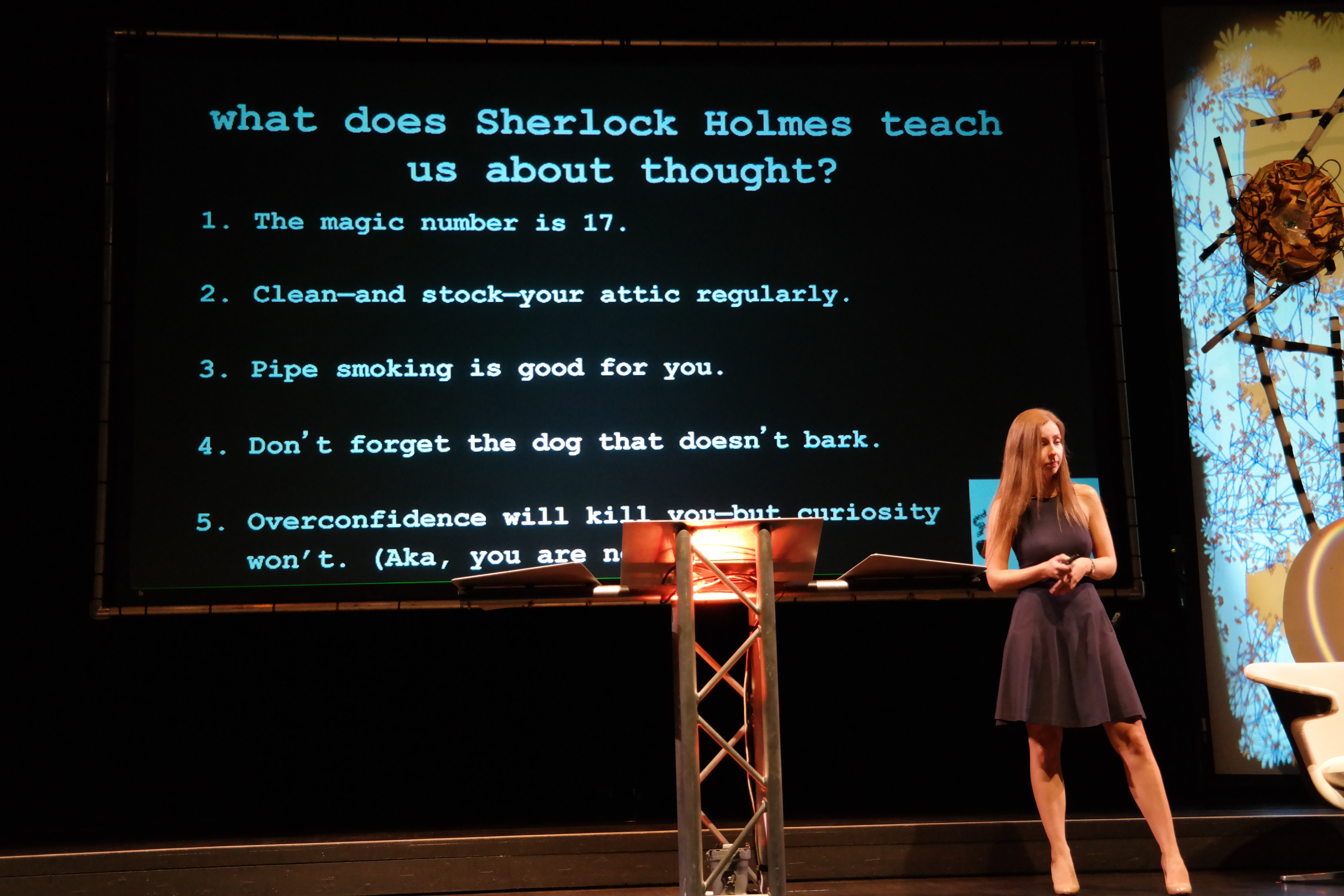
Konnikova at the IdeaFestival (2013)

Konnikova's first book, Mastermind: How to Think Like Sherlock Holmes, was nominated for an Agatha Award and the Anthony Award for Best Nonfiction in 2013. Her book The Confidence Game was published in 2016 and appeared on the New York Times' Crime and Punishment bestseller list. Her third book, The Biggest Bluff, published in 2020, chronicled her participation in the world of poker.

Konnikova makes regular appearances on The Gist podcast in her own segment, "Is That Bullshit?" In early 2017, she published a 10-part podcast about con artists and the lives they ruin, called The Grift.

=== Poker career ===
Konnikova has said that she became interested in poker after reading John von Neumann’s work on game theory. She described it as a way to examine the mind’s responses to conditions that involve both skill and chance. Konnikova told The New York Times, "When I started this, I didn’t know how many cards were in a deck. I hate casinos. I have zero interest in gambling."

Konnikova competed in her first major tournament, the PokerStars tournament 2017 in Monte Carlo. In January 2018, she won the PCA National event at the PokerStars Caribbean Adventure No-Limit Hold'em Championship, winning $84,600. The win also came with a Platinum Pass worth $30,000 to the PokerStars Players Championship in January 2019. Her total earnings prior to the event were about $30,000.

After her win in 2018, Konnikova delayed work on her book The Biggest Bluff in order to compete in more tournaments with higher stakes and she became a full-time professional poker player. From June 2018 to November 2019 she partnered with PokerStars, who sponsored her in professional tournaments. In September 2023, Konnikova rejoins PokerStars Team Pro.

Konnikova won her first World Series of Poker bracelet in the U.S. 2024 WSOP Online series, winning the event NLHE Fall Crazy 8’s event, along with a cash prize of $68,478.

== Awards ==
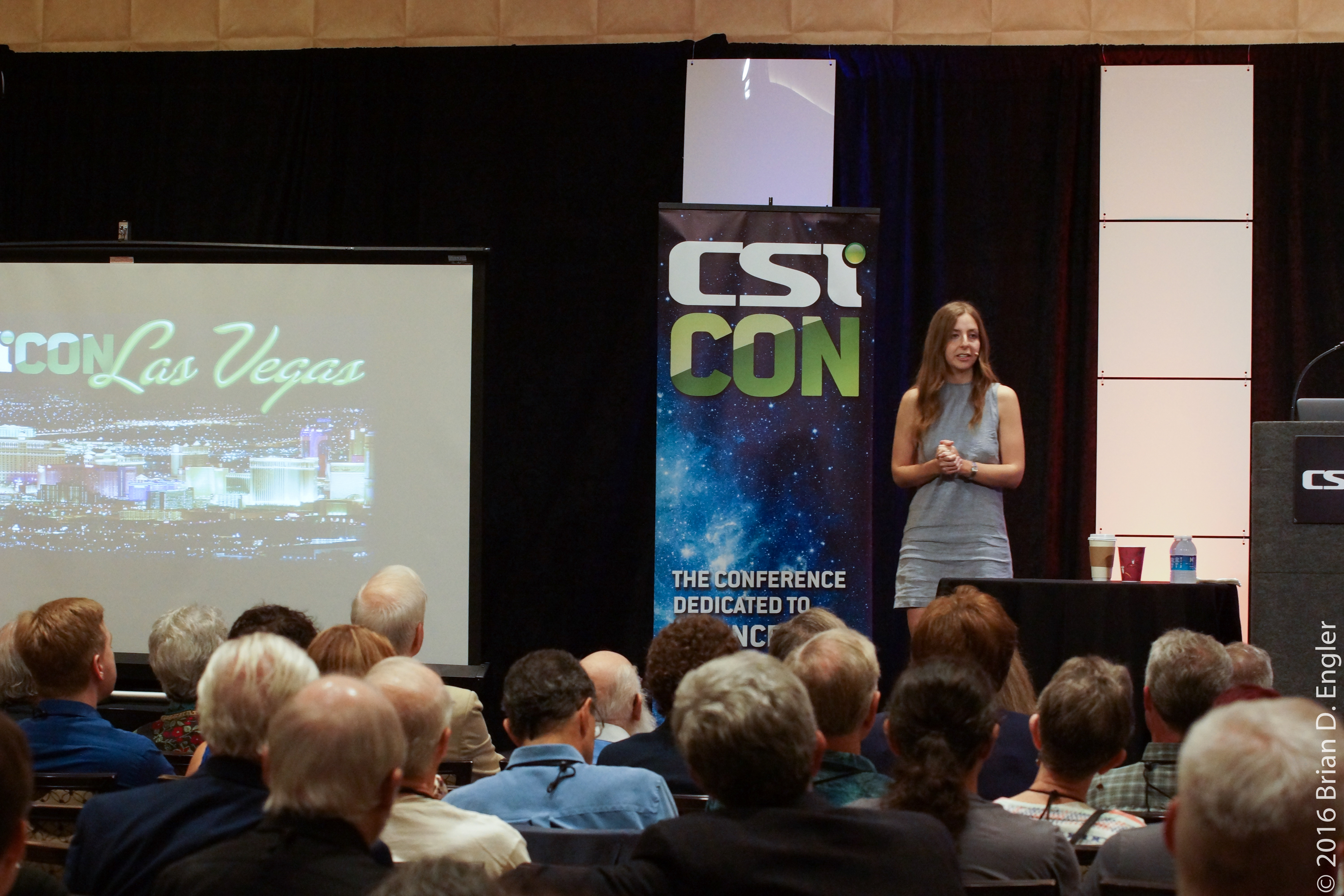
"Confidence Games" CSICon 2016

- Robert P. Balles Prize for The Confidence Game by the Committee for Skeptical Inquiry (2016)
- Featured in The Best American Science and Nature Writing, edited by Hope Jahren, for her article "Altered Tastes," about Heston Blumenthal (2017)
- Excellence in Science Journalism by The Society for Personality and Social Psychology (2019)

== Selected bibliography ==
- Mastermind: How to Think Like Sherlock Holmes, Viking, January 3, 2013, ISBN 978-0670026579
- The Confidence Game: Why We Fall for It . . . Every Time, Viking, January 12, 2016, ISBN 978-0525427414
- The Biggest Bluff: How I Learned to Pay Attention, Master Myself, and Win, Penguin Press, June 23, 2020, ISBN 978-0525522621
