= Margaret Bloy Graham =

Canadian children's book author and illustrator

Margaret Bloy Graham (2 November 1920 – 22 January 2015) was a Canadian creator of children's books, primarily as an illustrator of picture books. She is best known for her work on Harry the Dirty Dog (1956) and other books in the same series written by her then-husband Gene Zion.

== Early life ==
Graham was born in Toronto. Her father, Malcolm Robert Graham, was a physician and her mother Florence (née Bloy) was a nurse. When Graham was one, the family moved to Sandwich, Ontario (now part of Windsor), where her father became the superintendent of the local sanatorium. Her childhood was spent in Ontario, but she spent her summer holidays with either her grandfather in England or an aunt in the United States. The family returned to Toronto when she was ten. She attended Saturday morning classes at the Art Gallery of Ontario.

Graham majored in art history at the University of Toronto, graduating in 1943. After graduation, she attended a summer course at the Art Students League of New York. She later supplemented her studies at the New York University Institute of Fine Arts and also The New School for Social Research.

She decided to stay in New York to establish a career as a commercial artist. From 1944 to 1945 she worked as a drafter for Gibbs & Cox and in 1946 she started work in the art department of Condé Nast, where she remained until 1956.

== Career ==
Graham met her first husband Gene Zion at Condé Nast. They were married in July 1948.

Zion was urged by Graham and his editor, Ursula Nordstrom of Harper and Brothers, to write children's books. He has said that it was Graham’s sketch of children gathering apples in an orchard, done several years earlier in Canada, that inspired his first book, All Falling Down (1951).

The husband-and-wife team became famous for the Harry series of books, beginning with Harry the Dirty Dog (1956) and followed by No Roses for Harry! (1958), Harry and the Lady Next Door (1960) and Harry By the Sea (1965). The collaboration ended with their divorce in 1968.

Graham received two Caldecott Medals, one for her work on All Falling Down and the second for her work on The Storm Book.

Graham launched her own writing career around the time of the divorce with Be Nice to Spiders (1967). She later developed her own canine hero, Benjy, through a series of books.

== Later life ==
Graham remarried in 1972 to a merchant-ship officer, Oliver W. Holmes, Jr. She lived in Cambridge, Massachusetts in her retirement. She died on January 22, 2015. In 2022, she was inducted posthumously into the Canadian Cartoonist Hall of Fame.

=== Major works ===
==== As author and illustrator ====
Title	Year	Publisher
Be Nice To Spiders	1967	HarperCollins
Benjy and the Barking Bird	1971	HarperCollins
Benjy’s Dog House	1973	HarperCollins
Benjy’s Boat Trip	1977	HarperCollins
Benjy and His Friend Fifi	1988	HarperCollins

==== As illustrator ====
Title	Year	Author	Publisher
All Falling Down	1951	Gene Zion	HarperCollins
The Storm Book	1952	Charlotte Zolotow	HarperCollins
Hide and Seek Day	1954	Gene Zion	HarperCollins
The Summer Snowman	1955	Gene Zion	HarperCollins
Harry the Dirty Dog	1956	Gene Zion	HarperCollins
Really Spring	1956	Gene Zion	HarperCollins
Dear Garbage Man	1957	Gene Zion	HarperCollins
Jeffie's Party	1957	Gene Zion	HarperCollins
No Roses for Harry	1958	Gene Zion	HarperCollins
The Plant Sitter	1959	Gene Zion	HarperCollins
Harry and the Lady Next Door	1960	Gene Zion	HarperCollins
The Meanest Squirrel I Ever Met	1963	Gene Zion	Scribner's
The Sugar Mouse Cake	1964	Gene Zion	Scribner's
Harry by the Sea	1965	Gene Zion	HarperCollins
The Green Hornet Lunchbox	1970	Shirley Gordon	Houghton Mifflin
The Pack Rat’s Day and Other Poems	1974	Jack Prelutsky	Macmillan Publishers
What If?	1987	Else Holmelund Minarik	Greenwillow Books
It’s Spring!	1989	Else Holmelund Minarik	Greenwillow Books

== General references ==
- Commire, Anne (1977). "Graham, Margaret Bloy 1920-". Something about the author: facts and pictures about contemporary authors and illustrators of books for young people. Vol. 11. Detroit: Gale Research. pp. 119–120.
- Commire, Anne (1980). "ZION, (Eu)Gene 1913-1975". Something about the author. Vol. 18. Detroit: Gale Research. pp. 305–306.
- Graham, Margaret Bloy (1963). "Margaret Bloy Graham". In Fuller, Muriel (ed.). More junior authors. New York: Wilson. pp. 102–103.
- Kingman, Lee; Foster, Joanna; Lontoft, Ruth Giles, eds. (1968). "Graham, Margaret Bloy". Illustrators of Children's Books, 1957-1966. Vol. 3. Boston: Horn Book. p. 116. ISBN 978-0-87675-017-9.
- "Margaret Bloy Graham 1920-". Contemporary authors online. Gale. 2002.
- Pitchford, T.R. (2006). "Graham, Margaret Bloy". In Zipes, Jack (ed.). The Oxford Encyclopedia of Children's Literature. Oxford University Press. ISBN 978-0-19-530742-9.
- Silvey, Anita, ed. (2002). "Graham, Margaret Bloy". The essential guide to children's books and their creators. Boston: Houghton Mifflin Company. p. 181. ISBN 978-0-618-19083-6.
- Ward, M.E.; Marquardt, D.A. (1975). "GRAHAM, Margaret Bloy, 1920-". Illustrators of Books for Young People (2nd ed.). Metuchen, NJ: Scarecrow. p. 69.
