= Howard Lederer =

American poker player (born 1964)

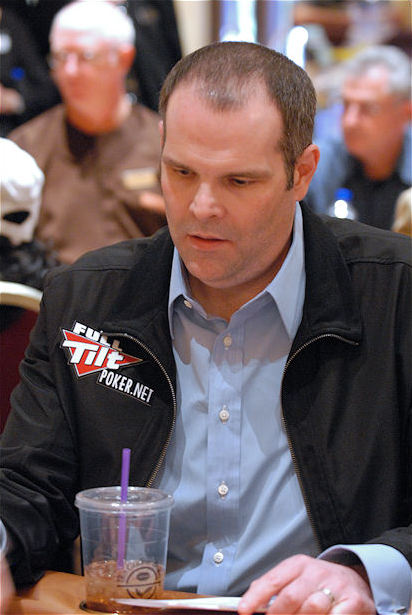
- Lederer in 2010
- Nickname: The Professor
- Born: October 30, 1964 (age 62); Concord, New Hampshire, U.S.

World Series of Poker
- Bracelets: 2
- Money finishes: 44
- Highest WSOP Main Event finish: 5th, 1987

World Poker Tour
- Titles: 2
- Final tables: 2
- Money finishes: 7

Howard Henry Lederer (born October 30, 1964) is an American professional poker player. He has won two World Series of Poker bracelets and holds two World Poker Tour titles. Lederer has also contributed to several books on poker strategy and has provided commentary for poker programming. He is known by poker fans and players as "The Professor" and is the older brother of professional poker player Annie Duke.

Lederer is a founder and board member of Tiltware, the company that launched Full Tilt Poker in 2004. In 2011, the Full Tilt Poker website was shut down by the United States Department of Justice on charges of bank fraud and illegal gambling. In December 2012, Lederer settled a civil lawsuit with the Department of Justice relating to Full Tilt Poker.

== Early life and family ==
Lederer was born in 1964 in Concord, New Hampshire and was introduced to card games at a young age by his family. As a child, Lederer's father also taught him to play chess. As a teenager, Lederer developed an interest in playing the game competitively. Lederer's sister, Annie Duke, is also a professional poker player. His father, Richard Lederer, is an author, linguist and a former educator at St. Paul's School. His other sister, Katy Lederer, is also an author. His father is Jewish, while his mother was a gentile. He was not raised Jewish.

== Professional poker career ==
=== Early career ===
After graduating from high school, Lederer began playing chess in New York City before discovering and developing an interest in live poker games and becoming a member of the Mayfair Club. Though he briefly attended Columbia University, Lederer ultimately decided to pursue a career in poker. It was during his time in New York City that Lederer began to mentor his sister, Annie Duke, who was playing poker in Billings, Montana at the time.

Lederer attempted to qualify for a World Series of Poker (WSOP) event in 1986, but was unsuccessful. The next year, he made the final table and finished fifth in the $10,000 no limit Hold 'em Main Event. In 1993, Lederer moved to Las Vegas to focus on his poker career.

=== Live poker ===
Between 1993 and 1999, Lederer made eight final tables at WSOP events, before winning his first WSOP bracelet in 2000, in a $5,000 limit Omaha Hi/Lo tournament. Lederer won his second WSOP bracelet in 2001 in a $5,000 no limit Deuce to Seven tournament. Some of Lederer's other notable live poker wins in the early 2000s include World Poker Tour (WPT) titles in 2002 and 2003, in addition to two first-place finishes at WPT events in 2004.

In 2008, Lederer won more than $1 million Australian dollars at the Aussie Millions High-Roller event. Two years later, he won $250,000 and placed second in the WSOP's Tournament of Champions.

As of 2022, Lederer's total live tournament winnings exceeded $6,500,000, with his last cash being in January 2011. His 44 cashes at the WSOP account for $1,587,702 of those winnings.

Lederer is also known as "The Professor", a nickname given to him by poker player and commentator Jesse May. According to Lederer, the nickname came "out of nowhere". More recently, this nickname has been attributed to Lederer's strategic approach to poker as well as his instructional style.

==== World Series of Poker Bracelets ====
Year	Tournament	Prize (US$)
2000	$5,000 Limit Omaha Hi-Lo	$198,000
2001	$5,000 Deuce to Seven Draw	$165,870

=== Other poker activities ===
In addition to live poker tournaments, Lederer has been involved in a number of other poker related activities. As of 2011, Lederer had appeared on NBC's Poker After Dark, a late-night poker program, fourteen times. He provided commentary for poker programming, including the Poker Superstars Invitational Tournament, Learn from the Pros, as well as other Fox Sports Network poker programs. He has also released instructional videos on poker, contributed to several books on poker strategy, including The Full Tilt Poker Strategy Guide, and hosted several poker fantasy camps in the mid-2000s. Additionally, from June 2006 to May 2011, Lederer was a member of the Poker Players Alliance's board of directors.

== Tiltware LLC and Full Tilt Poker ==
Lederer was a founding member and onetime president of Tiltware LLC, the company that handled marketing and software development for Full Tilt Poker. Tiltware LLC launched Full Tilt Poker in 2004. Lederer served on the company's board of directors along with co-founders Rafe Furst, Chris Ferguson, and Ray Bitar. Full Tilt Poker hosted online poker games and was a former sponsor of poker programming on ESPN and Poker After Dark, both in the United States and abroad.

Following a United States Department of Justice-led investigation, based on suspicion of money laundering and gambling violations, Full Tilt Poker's website was closed to players in the United States on April 15, 2011. The company's license was suspended on June 30, 2011, and Full Tilt Poker stopped accepting international play.

In September 2011, Lederer was named, along with two other members of the Full Tilt Poker board of directors, in an amended civil complaint filed by the Department of Justice, in which Full Tilt Poker was accused of defrauding poker players. Ultimately, the company's owners were accused of receiving around $443 million in player funds between 2007 and 2011. According to the Department of Justice, Lederer received about $42 million in payments from Full Tilt Poker during that time period. In a statement issued by the Department of Justice, Full Tilt Poker was referred to as a Ponzi scheme for paying out funds to Full Tilt Poker owners despite having insufficient funds to cover money owed to players. Full Tilt Poker denied the allegation that they operated a Ponzi scheme.

In 2012, a three-way settlement was reached between Full Tilt Poker, PokerStars, and the Department of Justice. Full Tilt Poker agreed to forfeit their assets to the Department of Justice and on the same day, PokerStars agreed to acquire those assets from the Department of Justice. As part of the agreement, PokerStars paid $547 million to the Department of Justice in addition to $184 million to poker players outside the United States who were owed money by Full Tilt Poker. Additionally, $150 million from the settlement money was intended to be used to refund U.S.-based customers.

Lederer personally settled with the Department of Justice in December 2012. He admitted no wrongdoing and agreed to forfeit assets totaling more than $2.5 million.

== Charitable activities ==
Lederer and his wife Suzie have previously hosted charity poker events including their April Fools fundraiser in 2009 to support the Las Vegas Springs Preserve. The Lederers have also hosted the Suzie and Howard Lederer Celebrity Charity Tourney, in 2009 and 2010, as part of their annual World Series of Barbecue event in Las Vegas. The charity poker event was a benefit for the Boys and Girls Club of Las Vegas. Lederer has also participated in other charity poker events including Put a Bad Beat on Cancer in 2009.

== Personal life ==
Though previously overweight, Lederer was able to lose weight as a result of gastric bypass surgery. In an interview in 2006, Lederer stated that he is a vegetarian. Lederer moved to Las Vegas, Nevada, in 1993, where he lives with his wife, Suzie, and his son, Mattias.
