= 2007 World Series of Poker Europe =

Series of poker tournaments

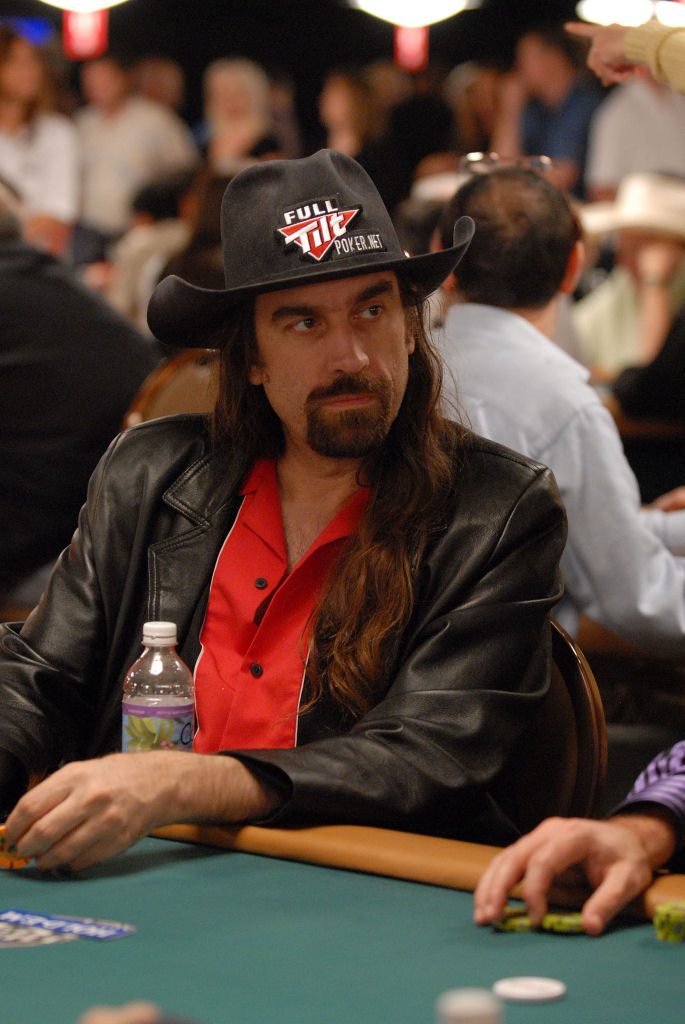
Five time bracelet winner, Chris Ferguson, finished in fourth place in the first event

The World Series of Poker Europe (WSOPE) is the first expansion effort of World Series of Poker-branded poker tournaments outside the United States. Since 1970, participants have had to travel to Las Vegas if they wanted to compete in the World Series of Poker (WSOP). Although the WSOP held circuit events in other locations, the main tournaments, which awarded bracelets to the winners, were exclusively held in Las Vegas. The inaugural WSOPE, held in 2007, marked the first time that a WSOP bracelet was awarded outside Las Vegas.

In 2004, Harrah's Casinos purchased the rights to the WSOP label. Harrah's later purchased London Clubs International (LCI). LCI operates three casinos in the London area: Fifty, Leicester Square, and The Sportsman. After the purchase of these casinos, Harrah's decided to expand its WSOP label into Europe. European casinos typically have a different environment than those in the U.S. Jeffrey Pollack, the WSOP Commissioner, indicated that the WSOPE would have a "style and flair that is both unique and appropriate to the setting. So don't be surprised if we require participants to wear blazers at the tables. If James Bond were hosting a poker tournament it may look like the World Series of Poker Europe."

In marketing the WSOPE, Harrah's Casino did not rely upon the reputation of Harrah's or the WSOP alone. On 5 July 2007, Harrah's announced its alliance with England-based Betfair, one of the largest online gaming companies in the world. The agreement builds on Betfair's European reputation in advertising the WSOPE while creating the largest agreement between a web-based and brick-and-mortar casinos. Due to changes in U.S. laws, effective in 2007, the WSOP could no longer accept money from online gambling companies. This prevented the WSOP from acknowledging WSOP qualifiers from online events. The WSOPE is not bound by this limitation. The United Kingdom Gambling Act of 2005 allows for legal regulated online poker sites. Furthermore, as the laws that govern the age of gambling differ in England than the U.S., the WSOPE admits younger players. In 2007, four of the five finalists at the first event of the WSOPE had won bracelets. Thomas Bihl, however, outlasted each of them to claim the first-ever WSOPE bracelet. No previous bracelet winners played at the second final table; Dario Alioto won the bracelet. Annette "Annette_15" Obrestad, became the youngest player to win a WSOP bracelet event at 18 years and 364 days old in the final event of the tournament. As of 2016, Obrestad's record still stands.

== Key ==
*	Elected to the Poker Hall of Fame
(#/#)	This denotes a bracelet winner. The first number is the number of bracelets won in 2007. The second number is the total number of bracelets won. Both numbers represent totals as of that point during the tournament.
Place	What place each player at the final table finished
Name	The player who made it to the final table
Prize (£)	The amount of money, in British Pounds (£), awarded for each finish at the event's final table

== Results ==
=== Event 1: £2,500 H.O.R.S.E. ===
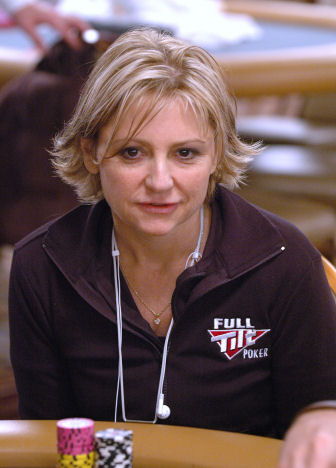
Jennifer Harman almost became the first player to win both a WSOP and WSOPE bracelet

- 3-day event: Thursday, 6 September 2007, to Saturday, 8 September 2007
- Number of buy-ins: 105
- Total Prize Pool: £262,500
- Number of Payouts: 16
- Winning Hand: 8♠ 9♣

Final Table
Place	Name	Prize
1st	Thomas Bihl (1/1)	£70,875
2nd	Jennifer Harman (0/2)	£40,688
3rd	Kirk Morrison (0/1)	£26,250
4th	Chris Ferguson (0/5)	£21,700
5th	Alex Kravchenko (0/1)	£17,850
6th	Yuval Bronshtein	£14,438
7th	Joe Beevers	£11,812
8th	Gary Jones	£9,188

=== Event 2: £5,000 Pot Limit Omaha ===
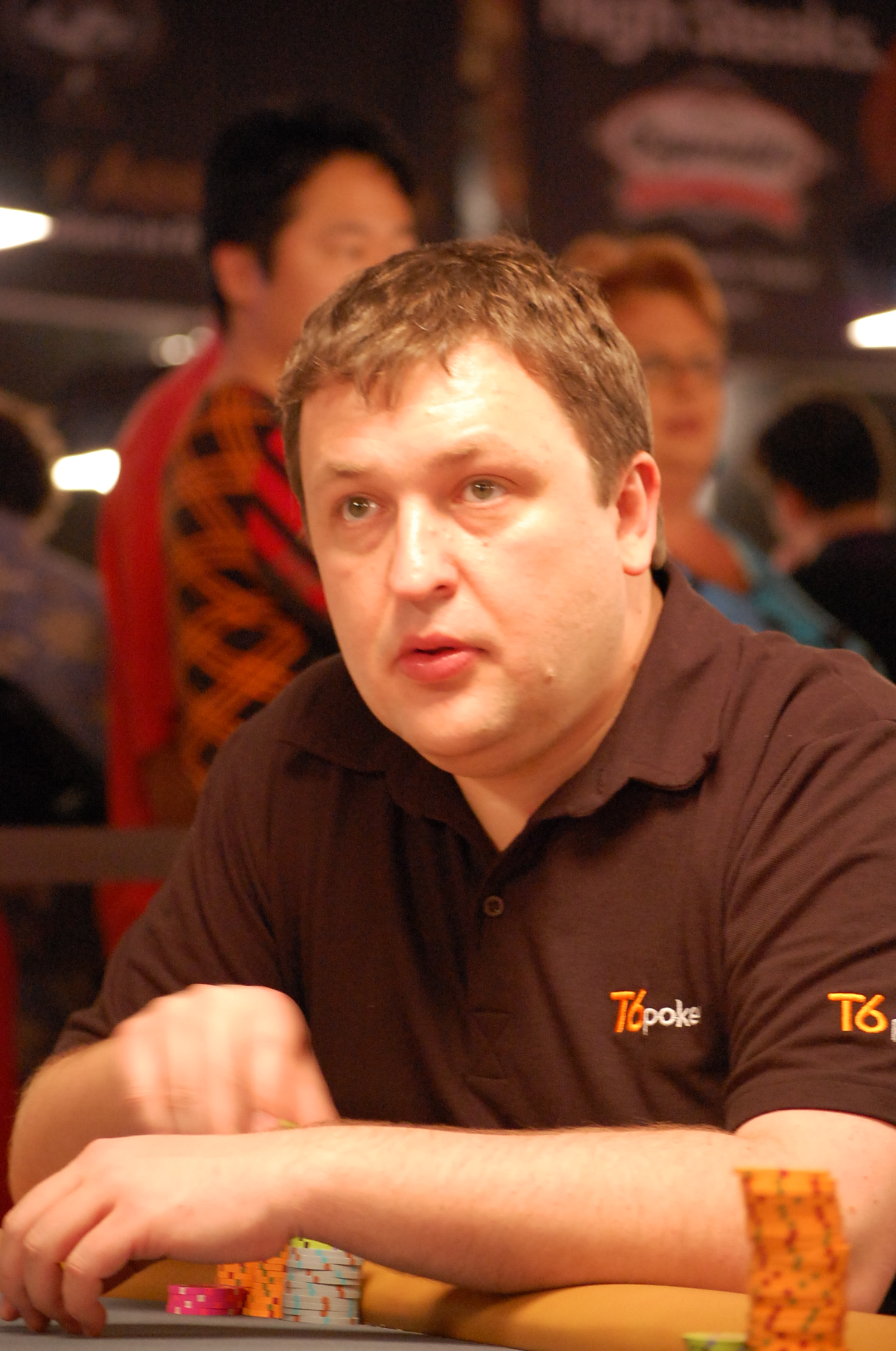
Tony G finished third in the £5,000 Pot Limit Omaha event

- 2-day event: Saturday, 8 September 2007, to Sunday, 9 September 2007
- Number of buy-ins: 165
- Total Prize Pool: £825,000
- Number of Payouts: 18
- Winning Hand: A♦ K♠ 7♣ 5♣

Final Table
Place	Name	Prize
1st	Dario Alioto (1/1)	£234,390
2nd	Istvan Novak	£137,280
3rd	Tony G	£94,380
4th	David Callaghan	£65,520
5th	Antoine Arnault	£49,530
6th	Sherkhan Farnood	£38,220
7th	Sampo Löppönen	£30,420
8th	Andy Bloch	£22,020
9th	M.H. Razaghi	£16,380

=== Event 3: £10,000 No Limit Hold'em Main Event ===
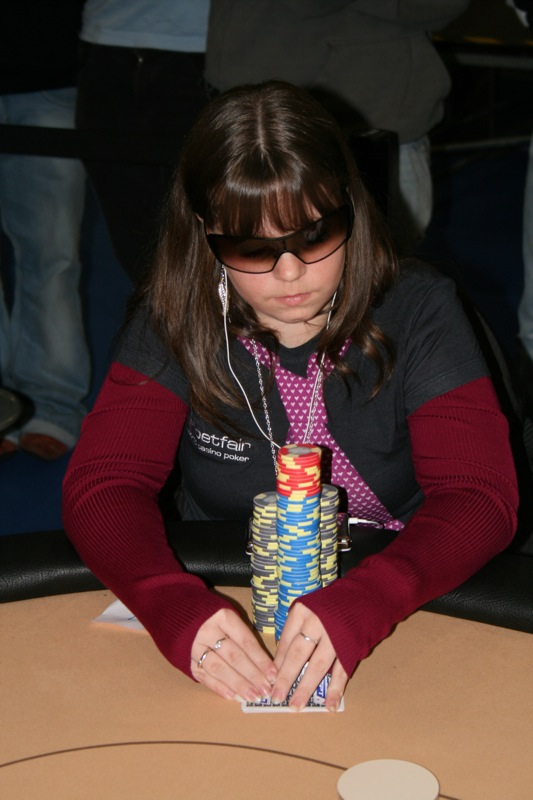
Annette Obrestadt became the youngest person to ever win a WSOP bracelet

- 7-day event: Monday, 10 September 2007, to Sunday, 16 September 2007
- Number of buy-ins: 362
- Total Prize Pool: £3,676,990
- Number of Payouts: 36
- Winning Hand: 7♥ 7♠

Final Table
Place	Name	Prize
1st	Annette Obrestad (1/1)	£1,000,000
2nd	John Tabatabai	£570,150
3rd	Matthew McCullough	£381,910
4th	Oyvind Riisem	£257,020
5th	Johannes Korsar	£191,860
6th	Dominic Kay	£152,040
7th	Magnus Persson	£114,030
8th	Theo Jørgensen	£85,070
9th	James Keys	£61,540
