= Kenny Tran =

Vietnamese American poker player

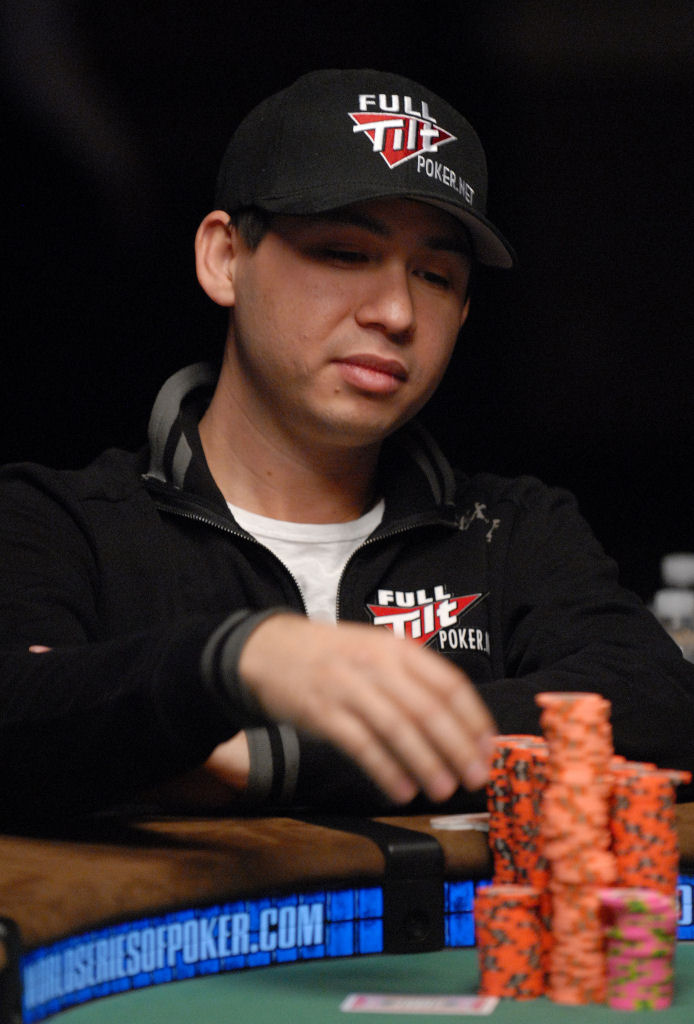
- Tran at the 2007 World Series of Poker Main Event
- Nicknames: The Kid; Sick Call Kenny; Vietnamese Google; Triad Kenny

World Series of Poker
- Bracelet: 1
- Money finishes: 13
- Highest WSOP Main Event finish: 16th, 2007

World Poker Tour
- Title: None
- Final table: None
- Money finishes: 3

Phuong "Kenny" Tran is a Vietnamese American professional poker player from Arcadia, California who won the 2008 World Series of Poker $10,000 Heads-Up No-Limit Hold'em World Championship. Tran was born in Vietnam and gives 10% of his winnings to his extended family there. He is married and has 3 children. He first began playing poker in 1992 at a bowling alley while working at McDonald's.

== World Series of Poker ==
He began playing tournaments in 1999 and has thirteen career World Series of Poker cashes. Tran made the final table of the $50,000 World Championship H.O.R.S.E. Event at the 2007 WSOP. He finished in 5th and won $444,000. In that same year he had his highest finish in the Main Event, finishing in 16th and earning $381,000. He also finished in 16th position in the inaugural World Series of Poker Europe Main Event, earning $68,000. At the 2008 World Series of Poker Tran won a bracelet in the $10,000 Heads-Up No-Limit Hold'em World Championship and his largest cash to date, earning $539,056.

World Series of Poker Bracelets
Year	Tournament	Prize (US$)
2008	$10,000 Heads-Up No-Limit Hold'em World Championship	$539,056

== Other poker events ==
Tran is known as a cash game specialist who plays in high-stakes No Limit Seven Card Stud games at the Commerce Casino in Los Angeles. He also used to play online on Full Tilt Poker where he was a sponsored professional. He has four World Poker Tour (WPT) cashes including finishing in 10th place at the Sixth Annual Five Star World Poker Classic in the $25,000 No Limit Hold'em WPT World Championship, earning $158,290. As of 2009, his total winnings exceed $2,100,000. His 13 cashes at the WSOP account for $1,661,619 of those winnings.
