= Raymond Rahme =

South African poker player

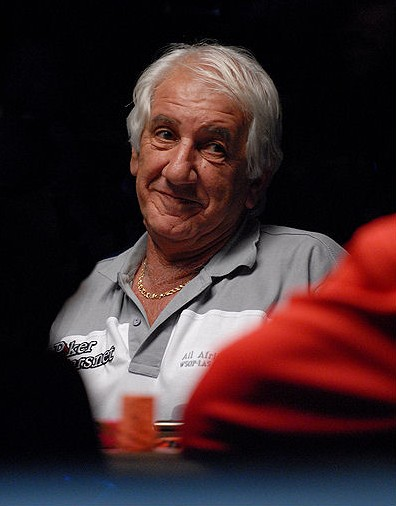
- Rahme at the 2007 World Series of Poker.

World Series of Poker
- Bracelet: None
- Money finishes: 3
- Highest WSOP Main Event finish: 3rd, 2007

European Poker Tour
- Title: None
- Final table: None
- Money finishes: 2

Raymond Rahme (born 1945) is a South African professional poker player. He was the first African to reach a final table at a World Series of Poker Main Event, finishing third and earning $3,048,025, equating to some R21,000,000 in his own country. He took his seat at the 2007 Main Event by finishing third at the All Africa Poker Championship, the largest poker tournament ever played on the African continent. Because of this windfall, Rahme has made more money than any other African tournament poker player.

== Early days ==
Rahme left school at the age of fifteen — "I have no formal education behind me [... but] I guess you could say I've been streetwise since an early age" — and bought his first automobile with money garnered from illegal gambling dens in Hillbrow, Gauteng, where he made ends meet.

As an adult, however, he became a successful businessman, involved in such a variety of concerns as construction, car dealerships, nightclubs, bookmaking, restaurants and "you name it".

== Today ==
Rahme and his late wife Bernadette have six children. He plays online poker as a member of "Team PokerStars" (which sponsored his trip to the WSOP) under the screen name "Ray Rahme", but it is less a passion than a duty now. "I don't really enjoy internet poker," he told SA Sports Illustrated recently, "but my contract says I have to play online for sixty hours a month. Internet poker is impersonal. You have no control over the game or your opponents."

In 2006, he came into the online game only as a retirement hobby after being introduced to it by a friend:

Initially I took part in cash competitions with online players, but I got frustrated because I kept losing money. I was about to give up when my friend suggested I try online gambling, and that's where it all began. I paid R77 to take part in a satellite tournament and made it through to a mini-tournament, where I had to pay R385 to sign up. I won that and was invited to the All Africa Poker Championship in Swaziland, not online but around the table, and, when I finished in the top four there, I got a travel package of R150,000 to the main WSOP tournament in Las Vegas.

He was strongly supported there by a vociferous throng of his countrymen, especially after he eliminated Alexander Kravchenko, at which point it burst into a jubilant rendition of "Shosholoza". It was only after the WSOP, however, that he decided to make a career of his hobby: "I didn't want to be known as a one-hit wonder." Since then, he has picked up victories at Gold Reef City and Emperor's Palace locally, and Sanremo, Swaziland and the Aussie Millions in Melbourne, among others. As of 2009, his total live tournament winnings exceed $3,500,000. His 5 cashes at the WSOP account for $3,098,287 of those winnings.
