= Durkee =

Durkee may refer to:

== Groups, organizations, companies ==
- Durkee (food business) is an American brand name under conglomerate ownership. It formerly was an independent food company, Durkee Famous Foods, founded by Eugene R. Durkee in 1851.
- Durkee Marine, former Staten Island marine hardware company

== People ==
- Charles Durkee (1805–1870), American politician from Wisconsin
- Charlie Durkee (born 1944), placekicker for the New Orleans Saints
- Norman Durkee (1948-2014), American composer and pianist
- Sarah Durkee, singer-songwriter
- William Durkee Williamson (1779–1846), American politician from Maine
- Will Durkee (born c. 1983), poker player

=== Characters ===
- Reese Durkee, fictional character on the soap opera Passions

== Other uses ==
- Durkee, Oregon, USA; an unincorporated community in Baker County
