= Michael Chu =

Michael Chu may refer to:

- Michael Chu (private equity investor), American private equity manager
- Michael Chu (poker player), American poker player
