= William Durkee =

Bill or William Durkee may refer to:

- Will Durkee (born c. 1983), American professional poker player
- Wilfred "Bill" Durkee (1921–2006), American professional basketball player
