= Ralph Schwartz =

American money manager and poker player

- Schwartz at the 2007 World Series of Poker
- Nickname: Ralphie

World Series of Poker
- Bracelet: 1
- Money finishes: 2
- Highest WSOP Main Event finish: None

Ralph Schwartz is a money manager on Wall Street. In 2007, he won a World Series of Poker bracelet in the $5,000 H.O.R.S.E. Championship. H.O.R.S.E. is a variation of poker where the type of poker rotates between limit hold'em, Omaha, Razz, Stud, and Seven card stud Eight or better.

Near the end of the first day, Schwartz was down to about $2,000 in chips and decided that his tournament was over. Deciding that he'd like to go out with his friends, he started playing super aggressive.

As of 2007, Ralph Schwartz has tournament winning of over $275,000.

== World Series of Poker bracelets ==
Year	Tournament	Prize (US$)
2007	$5,000 H.O.R.S.E. Championship	$275,683
