= Pelton =

Pelton may refer to:

== Places ==
- Pelton, County Durham, England
- Pelton Dam, United States
- Pelton Fell, England
- Pelton, New South Wales, Australia

== People ==
- Agnes Lawrence Pelton (1881–1961), American modernist painter
- Byron Pelton, American politician from Colorado
- Jack J. Pelton, former CEO of Cessna Aircraft Company
- Joe Pelton, American poker player
- Lester Allan Pelton, inventor of the
  - Pelton wheel
- Robert Young Pelton, adventure journalist
- Rod Pelton, American politician
- Ronald Pelton, NSA spy
