= Styczynski =

Styczynski or Styczyński is a Polish masculine surname, its feminine counterpart is Styczynska or Styczyńska. It may refer to:

- Gary Styczynski (born 1965), Polish American poker player
- Karolina Styczyńska (born 1991), Polish shogi player
