= Dao Bac =

Professional poker player

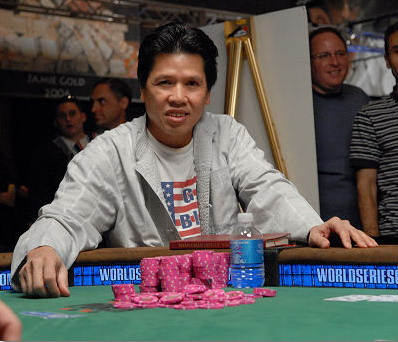
- Bac at the 2007 World Series of Poker

World Series of Poker
- Bracelet: 1
- Final table: 1
- Money finishes: 19
- Highest WSOP Main Event finish: None

World Poker Tour
- Title: None
- Final table: 1
- Money finish: 1

Dao Bac is a professional poker player from Garden Grove, California. In 2007, Bac won a World Series of Poker bracelet in the $1,000 S.H.O.E. event. S.H.O.E. is a rotational event comprising Seven-Card Stud, Limit Hold'em, Omaha High-Low, and Stud Eight-or-better.

Bac was born in Vietnam and came to the United States in 1989.

As of 2008, Bac has tournament winnings of over $800,000.

== World Series of Poker bracelets ==
Year	Tournament	Prize (US$)
2007	$1,000 S.H.O.E. Event	$157,975
