= Thomas Bihl =

German poker player (born 1975)

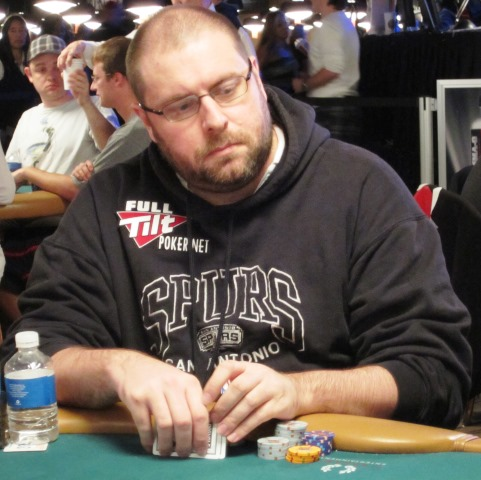
- Bihl at the 2011 World Series of Poker
- Nickname: Buzzer
- Born: 1975 (age 50–51)

World Series of Poker
- Bracelet: 1
- Money finishes: 3

European Poker Tour
- Money finishes: 3

Thomas Bihl (born 1975) is a German poker player who became the first person to win a World Series of Poker bracelet outside Las Vegas, Nevada. Bihl was sponsored by Betfair, the official sponsor of the 2007 World Series of Poker Europe (WSOPE).

His bracelet win came in a HORSE event. Bihl defeated Jennifer Harman heads-up after Harman raised all-in with two pair. Bihl had an open-ended straight and flush draw. He hit his straight on the river, winning the inaugural WSOPE event.

As of 2026, his live tournament winnings approximately $419,325.

== World Series of Poker bracelets ==
Year	Tournament	Prize
2007E	£2,500 World Championship H.O.R.S.E.	£70,875

An "E" following a year denotes bracelet(s) won at the World Series of Poker Europe

== Publications ==
Bihl co-authored a chapter on Sit'n'Go strategy in Poker Matrix: Dimensionen des Erfolgs (2007), a German-language book written jointly with fellow German poker players Stephan M. Kalhamer, Michael Keiner, Sebastian Ruthenberg and Katja Thater.
