= Tom Vu =

Vietnamese American entrepreneur (born 1957)

Tuan Vu
- Nickname: Tommy
- Born: 5 December 1957 (age 68); Vietnam

World Series of Poker
- Money finishes: 10
- Highest WSOP Main Event finish: 22nd, 2005

Tuan Anh Vu (Vietnamese: Vũ Tuấn Anh; born December 5, 1957), better known as Tommy or Tom Vu, is a Vietnamese American poker player, real estate investor and speaker best remembered as an infomercial personality in the late 1980s and early 1990s.

== Early life and education ==
Vu was born on December 5, 1957, and was the eldest of ten children born into a prosperous family in South Vietnam. His father was a landowner, businessman, and member of the military. Vu received his early education at a Catholic school in Saigon.

In 1975, at the age of 17, Vu and his family were among the many South Vietnamese boat people who fled Vietnam during the Fall of Saigon. Their departure occurred amid chaotic conditions, including explosions and Viet Cong artillery fire directed at evacuation vessels. The family became separated during this period. Vu has recounted an incident where he, two sisters, and a brother switched boats shortly before witnessing the destruction of the original boat in an explosion.

As refugees, the Vu family was processed through centers in the Philippines and Guam before arriving at Eglin Air Force Base in northern Florida. The base served as a temporary resettlement location for over 10,000 Vietnamese refugees during the summer of 1975. The Vu family subsequently settled in a two-bedroom apartment in Altamonte Springs, Florida.

Upon arrival in the United States, Vu did not speak English. Vu has stated that he attempted to self-study using an English-Vietnamese dictionary and a novel. He engaged in various entry-level jobs, including working as a busboy, grocery bagger, and dishwasher, to support himself. Vu began attending college and earnt a Bachelor of Business Administration degree from the University of Central Florida at the end of 1980.

== Infomercial career ==
In 1982, Vu began conducting seminars. His late-night infomercial featured Vu surrounded by luxury items: mansions, yachts, and expensive cars. He was often shown accompanied by groups of young bikini-clad women. He promoted his free 90-minute seminar to learn the same secrets he used to make millions. As a Vietnamese immigrant, he presented himself as the classic "rags to riches" story.

His infomercials promoted free seminars that served as advertisements for paid seminars, the most expensive of which was a week-long seminar held only in Orlando, Florida that cost as much as $16,000. Vu's investment theory involved finding what he characterized as "distressed" properties, such as homes mired in foreclosures, bankruptcies, divorces or tax liens, and selling them at a profit.

In the early 1990s, Vu was sued by former students and investigated by government officials in Florida for alleged violations of securities laws, fraud and false advertising. He was never formally charged with any crime.

Formerly of Longwood, Florida and later a California resident, Vu has retired from real estate and lives in Las Vegas, Nevada.

== Professional poker career ==
Vu continues his parallel career as a tournament poker player. As of 2017, he had won more than $1,975,000 in casino poker tournaments, including a second-place finish in a no limit Texas hold 'em event at the 2007 World Series of Poker and a 22nd-place finish at the 2005 World Series of Poker championship event. His 10 cashes at the WSOP account for over $850,000 of his lifetime tournament winnings.

In April 2006, he finished ninth in the Season Five World Poker Tour championship event, earning $216,585.

== References in popular culture ==
Vu and his infomercials and seminars have been parodied numerous times, including on the animated series Courage the Cowardly Dog, King of the Hill, Beavis and Butt-head and Family Guy, TV sketch shows In Living Color and Saturday Night Live, the 1995 Troma film Blondes Have More Guns, Martin Scorsese's film The Wolf of Wall Street and in the 2013 Michael Bay film Pain & Gain.

Vu was interviewed by Tom Arnold for his HBO comedy special Tom Arnold: The Naked Truth. Vu was one of the subjects of Renee Tajima-Peña's documentary series about Asian Americans, MY AMERICA... (or Honk if You Love Buddha).

Vu was referred to in episode 6 of Showtime's Superpumped: The Battle for Uber.

Vu is mentioned in the song "Town to Town," by Hello the Band, a side project of John Flansburgh of They Might be Giants.

Vu is referred to in the lyrics of the song “Professor Booty,” by the Beastie Boys.
