= Lukasz Dumanski =

Ivory Coast-born Polish-Canadian poker player

Łukasz Dumański
- Born: 20 April 1983 (age 43); Ivory Coast

World Series of Poker
- Bracelet: 1
- Money finishes: 3
- Highest WSOP Main Event finish: None

Łukasz Dumański (pronounced [ˈwukaʐ duˈmaj̃skʲi]; born 20 April 1983) is an Ivory Coast-born Polish-Canadian professional poker player who now resides in Toronto, Canada. In 2007, he won a World Series of Poker bracelet in the $1,500 Pot Limit Omaha Hi/Lo Split 8 or Better. This was the first time this event was ever played at the World Series of Poker.

Up to 2008, Łukasz Dumanski had poker tournament winning of over $240,000.

== World Series of Poker bracelets ==
Year	Tournament	Prize (US$)
2007	$1,500 Pot Limit Omaha Hi/Lo Split 8 or Better	$227,454
