= Saif Ahmad =

Bangladeshi-American restaurateur and poker player

Saifuddin Ahmad
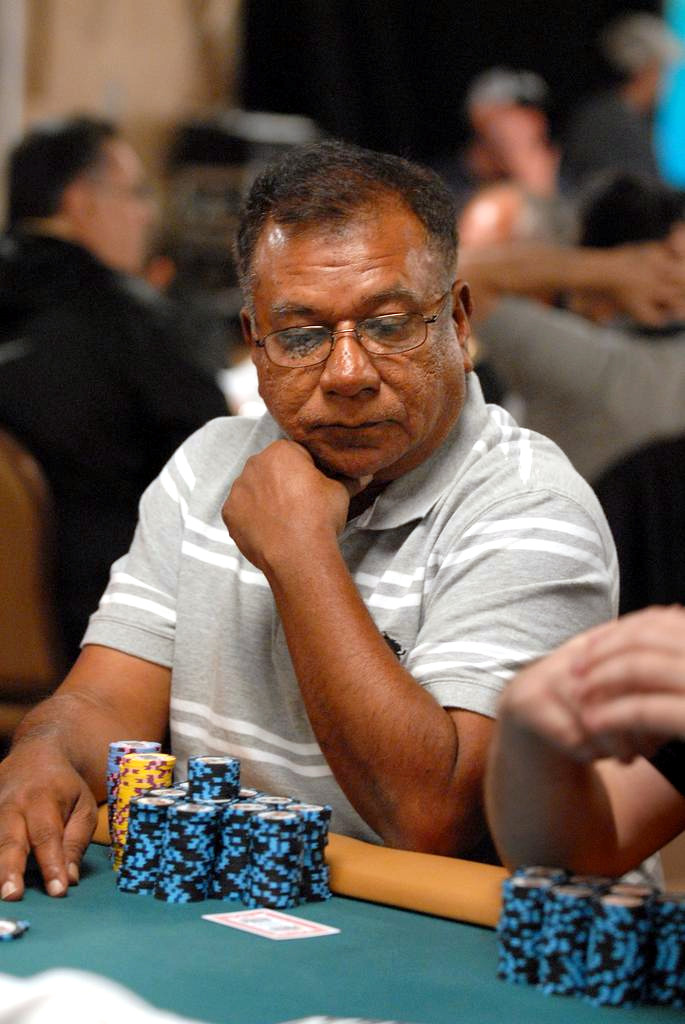
- Ahmad at the 2007 World Series of Poker

World Series of Poker
- Bracelet: 1
- Money finishes: 2
- Highest WSOP Main Event finish: None

World Poker Tour
- Title: None
- Final table: None
- Money finish: 1

Saifuddin Ahmad is a Bangladeshi-American restaurateur and World Series of Poker champion. Ahmad is the owner of several Tony Roma's restaurants in Los Angeles, California, and won a bracelet at the 2007 WSOP.

Ahmad came to the United States from Bangladesh to attend college where he earned a master's degree in chemical engineering from the California Institute of Technology.

As of 2008, Ahmad has live tournament winnings of over $560,000.

== World Series of Poker bracelets ==
Year	Tournament	Prize (US$)
2007	$2,000 Limit Hold'em	$217,329
