= Kirk Morrison (poker player) =

American poker player

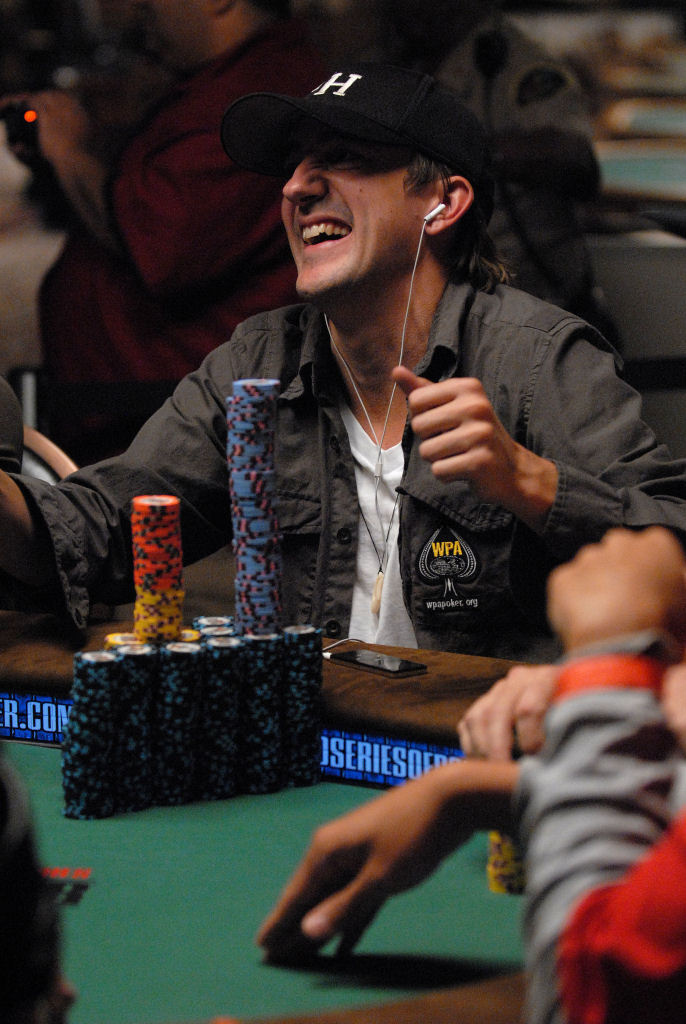
- Morrison during the 2007 World Series of Poker
- Nickname: Captain Kirk

World Series of Poker
- Bracelet: 1
- Final tables: 4
- Money finishes: 10
- Highest WSOP Main Event finish: 56th, 2007

World Poker Tour
- Title: None
- Final tables: 2
- Money finishes: 6

Kirk Morrison is an American poker player.

Morrison had his first major cash in a 3rd place finish in a $1,500 Limit Hold'em even in the 1994 WSOP. Morrison's poker tournament accomplishments include winning a 1998 World Series of Poker bracelet in seven-card stud and winning second place at the Season Five World Poker Tour championship event. This second place, which paid $2,011,135 is his biggest tournament cash. He has made three other World Series of Poker final tables, one in 1994 and two in 2007 ($5,000 Mixed Hold 'Em and £2,500 H.O.R.S.E.).

As of 2008, his total live tournament winnings exceed $2,900,000. His nine cashes as the WSOP account for $525,769 of those winnings.
