= John Guth =

American poker player (born 1981)

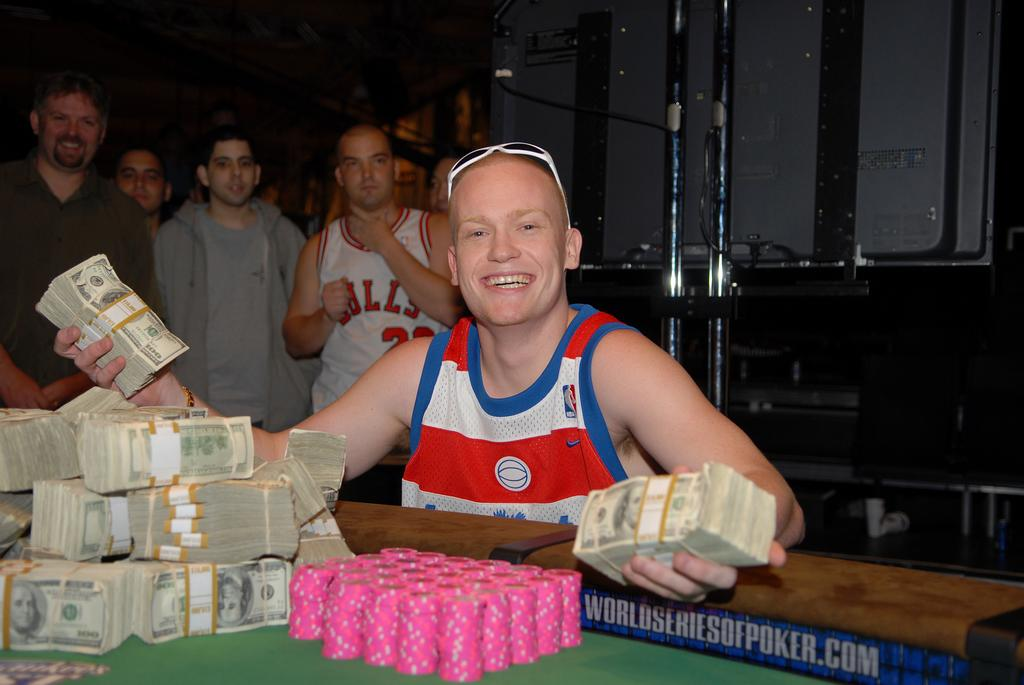
- Guth at the 2007 World Series of Poker after winning his bracelet
- Nickname: Sir Scoopalot

World Series of Poker
- Bracelet: 1
- Final table: 1
- Money finishes: 3
- Highest WSOP Main Event finish: None

John Guth (born June 21, 1981) is a professional poker player from Vancouver, Washington who won a bracelet at the World Championship Limit Omaha-8 event at the 2007 World Series of Poker.

Guth plays online under the handle "Sirscoopsalot." He's also the activities director at Camp Scoopy.

As of 2007, his total live tournament winnings exceed $380,000.
