= Hevad Khan =

American poker player (born 1985)

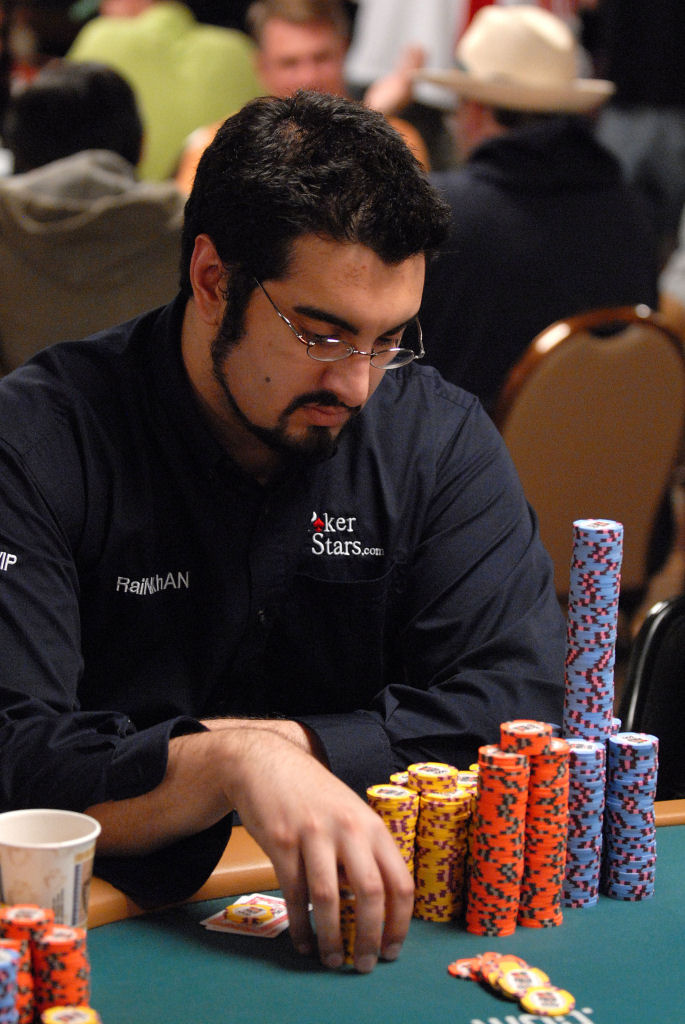
- Khan at the 2007 World Series of Poker.
- Nickname: RaiNKhAN

World Series of Poker
- Bracelet: None
- Final table: 1
- Money finishes: 7
- Highest WSOP Main Event finish: 6th, 2007

World Poker Tour
- Title: None
- Final table: None
- Money finishes: 3

European Poker Tour
- Title: None
- Final table: None
- Money finish: 1

Hevad Khan (born January 25, 1985) is an American professional poker player, best known for making the final table at the 2007 World Series of Poker Main Event, where he finished in sixth place.

== Competitive Gaming ==
Khan began on the competitive StarCraft: Brood War at the age of 13. Other StarCraft professionals include fellow Team PokerStars member Bertrand Grospellier. Khan is also known within the Marvel vs Capcom 2 community.

== Poker ==
Khan's nickname "RaiNKhaN" was adapted, along with his last name, from the Mortal Kombat character "Rain," who serves as an assassin for Shao Kahn in the series. Khan dropped out from SUNY Albany in order to concentrate on playing poker professionally. Khan is known to multi-table many online tournaments, so much so that he had a friend of his film him for a YouTube video in which he played 26 sit-and-go tournaments simultaneously on a single computer monitor to prove that he wasn't a Pokerbot. On March 23, 2008, Khan won the PokerStars Sunday Warm-up, a weekly $215 buy-in tournament in which he outlasted a field of 2,504 players in more than nine hours of play, earning $97,856.

At the 2007 World Series of Poker Main Event, Khan finished in sixth place, earning $956,243. He also finished in the money during two other WSOP events. For the 2008 World Series of Poker a new rule was put into effect, known colloquially as the "Hevad Khan Rule". The rule, which disallows boisterous celebrations from any player, was drafted as a response to the perceived over-the-top actions Khan employed during the 2007 Series when he won a hand.

At the 2008 Foxwoods Poker Classic, Khan won the $1,850 No Limit Hold'em event, earning $108,187, after defeating 2006 World Series of Poker third place finalist Michael Binger during heads-up play. At the 2008 Caesars Palace Classic, Khan won the $10,000 No Limit Hold'em Championship event, earning the $1,000,000 first place prize, his largest win to date. As of 2008, his total live tournament winnings exceed $2,500,000. His seven cashes at the WSOP account for $1,046,701 of those winnings.
