= Sally Boyer =

American poker player

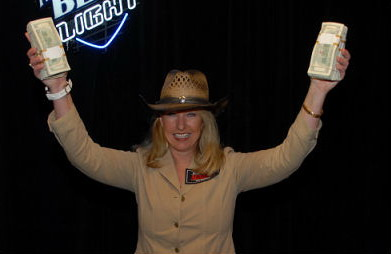
- Boyer, after winning the 2007 World Series of Poker Ladies World Championship event
- Nickname: None

World Series of Poker
- Bracelet: 1
- Money finish: 1
- Highest WSOP Main Event finish: None

Sally Anne Boyer is the 2007 World Series of Poker bracelet winner in the $1,000 World Championship Ladies Event No Limit Hold'em event. She won her seat in the event in a $65 buy-in tournament.

She resides from Park City, Utah.

Prior to the 2007 event, Boyer had only been playing poker for less than a year. She did, however, attend the debut of the World Series of Poker Ladies Academy.

As of 2014, Boyer has tournament winnings of $267,685.

== World Series of Poker bracelets ==
Year	Tournament	Prize (US$)
2007	$1,000 World Championship Ladies Event No Limit Hold'em	$262,077
