= Michael Chu (poker player) =

Canadian poker player

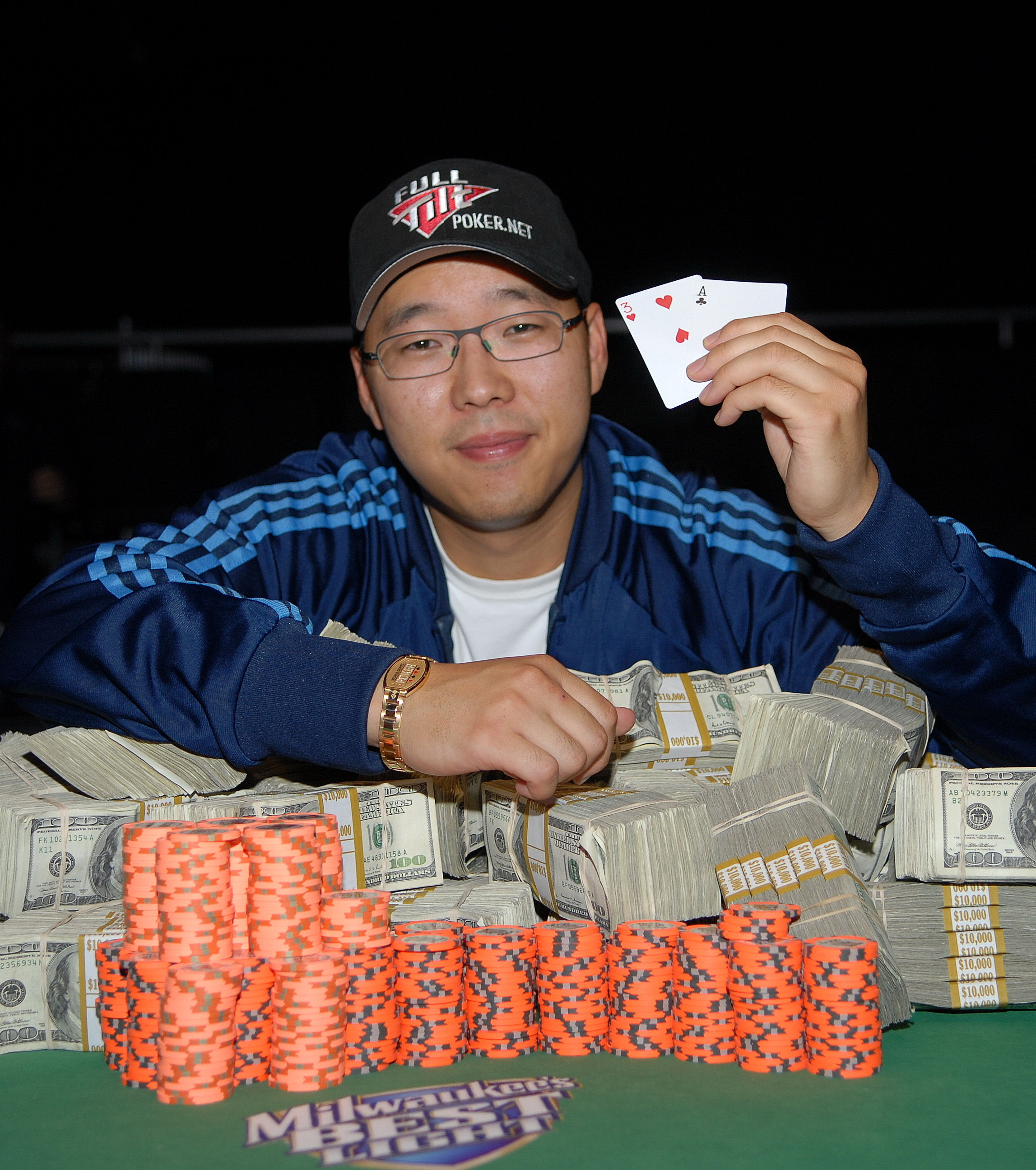
- Chu, After winning the $1,000 No Limit Hold'em w/Rebuys event at the 2007 World Series of Poker

World Series of Poker
- Bracelet: 1
- Money finishes: 3
- Highest WSOP Main Event finish: None

World Poker Tour
- Title: None
- Final table: None
- Money finish: 1

Michael Chu is a Canadian poker player who earned a World Series of Poker bracelet in the 2007 $1,000 WSOP No Limit Hold'em with rebuys event (Event #8), an event that was broadcast on ESPN. Chu won the event with the minimum investment, having never made a single re-buy in the event. He has been playing poker with his friends since high school and college, and credits the motion picture film Rounders as sparking his interest in Texas Hold 'Em.

As of 2008, Michael Chu has tournament winning in excess of $630,000. His three cashes as the WSOP account for the overwhelming majority, $616,096, of those winnings.

== Background ==
Chu was born in Seoul, South Korea, and was living in Los Angeles in 2007, where he worked as a stock trader. He had been playing poker for about ten years when he won his bracelet.

== 2007 World Series of Poker ==
Chu won Event #8, the $1,000 no-limit hold'em event with rebuys, at the 2007 World Series of Poker. The event drew 844 entrants and a prize pool of $2,533,062. It was Chu's first WSOP cash and his second year at the WSOP, and he won without making a single rebuy.

Chu came to the final table of nine with the fourth-largest stack. His opponents included Tommy Vu, Amir Vahedi, Shane Schleger and Michael Gracz. Over the course of the final table he eliminated Schleger in fifth place and Barry Cales in third place. Playing heads-up against Vu, he trailed in chips at the start, then took control after hitting a straight on the river in a hand where Vu had been ahead. Chu won the title when his ace-three held against Vu's king-eight on hand 138 of the final table.

Chu received $585,744, a Corum watch and a WSOP bracelet. After the win he said he might play a few more tournaments but had no plans to quit his day job. The final table was broadcast on ESPN.

== World Series of Poker bracelets ==
Year	Tournament	Prize (US$)
2007	$1,000 No Limit Hold'em w/ rebuys	$585,774
