= Jason Warner =

Canadian poker player

- Born: c. 1985 (age 40–41)

World Series of Poker
- Bracelet: 1
- Money finish: 1
- Highest WSOP Main Event finish: None

World Poker Tour
- Title: None
- Final table: None
- Money finish: 1

Jason Warner (born c. 1985) is a Canadian hardware store worker who won a World Series of Poker bracelet in the 2007 $1,500 No-Limit Hold'em short handed. Warner does not like playing poker online, preferring to play at the River Rock Casino near Vancouver. Prior to winning his bracelet he participated in one other WSOP event and a Canadian Poker Tour event where he won $22,000. After winning a bracelet at the WSOP, he finished in the money at World Poker Tour's $10,000 Bellagio Cup III tournament.

As of 2008, Warner has tournament winnings in excess of $490,000.

== World Series of Poker bracelets ==
Year	Tournament	Prize (US$)
2007	$1,500 No-Limit Hold'em 6-Handed	$481,698
