= Dario Alioto =

Italian poker player (born 1984)

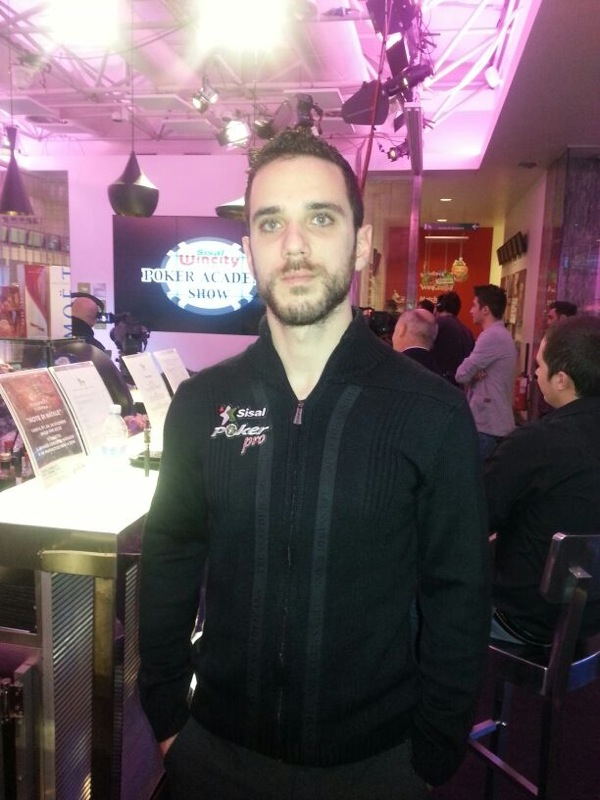
- Nickname: Ryu

World Series of Poker
- Bracelet: 1
- Money finishes: 21

European Poker Tour
- Title: None
- Final table: 1
- Money finish: 1

Dario Alioto (born 1984) is a professional poker player from Palermo, Italy. Alioto's first major success in poker came at the European Poker Tour 2005 Barcellona main event, where he finished in 7th place and earned €52,000. Right after this score, he started grinding PLO cash games that became his best poker game, rapidly becoming one of the best Italian professional players. Later on in his career, he won his first World Series of Poker bracelet in the £5,000 Pot Limit Omaha event at the 2007 World Series of Poker Europe. Alioto earned £234,390 for his finish. He has also had success at the 2008 World Series of Poker, where he has earned over $230,000 from four cashes. A well-respected cash game player online and live, he played most of the many televised Italian high-stakes cash games in the last few years. He now plays a wide variety of games and is now considered one of the best all-around players in Europe.

In 2009, Alioto has been the captain of the Sisal Poker Team Pro, which was voted the #1 Team Pro in Italy for 2009 and 2010.

== Poker career ==
Alioto made his first career WSOP cash at the $1,500 PLO/8 event, scoring a Final Table with a 6th-place finish and earning $33,759, after one week cashed at the $10,000 PLO WSOP World Championship for $22,137.

At the 2008 WSOP, event 34 (PL Omaha $1,500) came 4th, cashing $180,534 and came 19th at the WSOP Pot Limit Omaha World Championship for $28,651, cashed two more times the same year, finishing 9th and 12th on 2-7 Lowball events.

At the 2009 WSOP in the Event #5 (1,500 PLO) - the biggest Pot Limit Omaha field of all time - came 7th at the Final Table, collecting $29,881. Still the same year at the event #42 (WSOP Mixed Event $2500) scored his fifth WSOP final table with an 8th place, cashing $25,860.

Won a side event EPT Title (Pot Limit Omaha hi/low, 2009) in London, at the biggest PLO/8 - 1000 Pound buy-in - ever held in Europe for this game. Won one more title at Prague's Ept at the €1,000 NL Holdem/ PL Omaha mixed, in December 2010.

Team Italy's Captain at the last three editions of European Nation's Cup, leading his team to the runner-up place 2008 and 9th place in 2009 and in 2010 missed again the chance to become European Champion with his Team (Sisalpoker Team Pro) running up against title winner Finland of Juha Helpi.

At the 2011 WSOP, at the PLO $10,000 World Championships came, Alioto came in fifth place earning $204,113

At the 2013 WSOP, at the $2,500 Mixed 8-Games scored his second career 8-Game Final Table, he finished in sixth place, collecting $35,634

=== Other records ===
- Leads the European Omaha all time money list, that ranks all the Omaha tournament scores in Europe of all times, putting him as the most winning tournament PLO player ever in Europe.
- Best Pot Limit Omaha (PLO/8) performer at the WSOP (Years 2007–09), scoring 6 ITM finishes, with 4 Final Tables and 1 Bracelet's winning.
- Ranked 4th in the WSOP Omaha All time money list.
- Most winning Italian player ever on non-Holdem tournaments.
- First Italian ever to score both WSOP and EPT Final Tables.
- Holds the record ( seven ) of most WSOP Final Table finishes in Italy.
- Youngest Italian to ever win a WSOP bracelet.
- First Italian at the 2011 WSOP money list
- Winner of the EPT Omaha Award rankings for season 7, second place for the Mixed games ranking and fifth for the overall
- Ept side events scores, seasons 6 and 7:
- Titles: 2 (Pot Limit Omaha Hi/Low London 2009 and Mixed NL Holdem-Pot Limit Omaha Prague 2010)
- Final Tables: 15
- Cashes: 17
- As of August 2013, his total live tournament winnings exceed $1,531,440.

=== Money winnings ===
2005	2006	2007	2008	2009	2010	2011	2012	2013	Career winnings
67.204	11.627	542.685	339.811	119.721	128.512	223.244	100.097	49.974	1.531.440

Source: All values in USD.

=== World Series of Poker bracelets ===
Year	Tournament	Prize
2007E	£5,000 Pot Limit Omaha	£234,390

An "E" following a year denotes bracelet(s) won at the World Series of Poker Europe
