= Mike Spegal =

American poker player (born 1968)

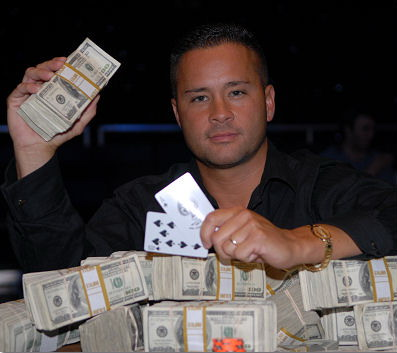
- Spegal at the 2007 World Series of Poker
- Nickname: None
- Born: April 6, 1968 (age 58); Newton, Iowa, U.S.

World Series of Poker
- Bracelet: 1
- Money finishes: 2
- Highest WSOP Main Event finish: None

Mike Spegal (born April 6, 1968 in Newton, Iowa) is a former Marine and currently owns a UPS store. In 2006, he won his entry into the World Series of Poker Main event in an Online Satellite. In 2007, he defeated Gavin Smith to win a WSOP bracelet in the $1,500 Pot-Limit Hold'em event.

As of 2023, Spegal has live tournament winnings in excess of $310,000.

== World Series of Poker bracelets ==
Year	Tournament	Prize (US$)
2007	$1500 Pot Limit Hold'em	$251,957
