= Nenad Medić =

Serbian-Canadian poker player (born 1982)

Nenad Medic
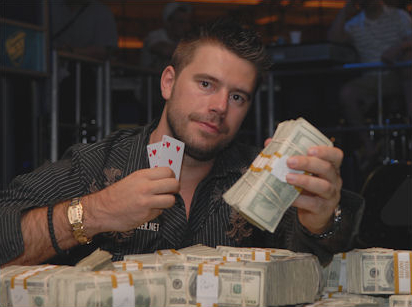
- Medic after winning the $10,000 Pot-Limit Hold'em World Championship at the 2008 World Series of Poker
- Nickname: Serb
- Born: 21 December 1982 (age 43); Apatin, SR Serbia, SFR Yugoslavia

World Series of Poker
- Bracelet: 1
- Money finishes: 8

World Poker Tour
- Title: 1
- Final tables: 4
- Money finishes: 15

Nenad Medić (Serbian Cyrillic: Ненад Медић, born 21 December 1982, in Apatin, SR Serbia, SFR Yugoslavia) is a Serbian professional poker player with a World Series of Poker bracelet and World Poker Tour Championship title. He resides in Niagara Falls, Ontario. Medić plays online poker under the alias Serb2127.

Nenad Medić played basketball in college while attending the University of Waterloo and began playing poker with his teammates. Upon leaving college he began playing online poker professionally. He soon began finding success in tournaments, making his first WPT final table at the PokerStars.com Caribbean Poker Adventure in 2005. In January 2006 he made the final table at the Aussie Millions, finishing in third place and earning $282,432. In November of that year he won his first WPT title at the World Poker Finals, earning $1,717,194. Medić again made the final table at the World Poker Finals in 2007, finishing in third place and winning $486,367.

== World Series of Poker ==
On 1 June, at the first event of the 2008 World Series of Poker, Medić won his first World Series of Poker bracelet after defeating Andy Bloch during heads-up play in the $10,000 Pot-Limit Hold'em World Championship, earning $794,112. He accomplished this with a Final Table made up of professionals such as Phil Laak, Mike Sowers, Patrik Antonius, Mike Sexton and Kathy Liebert.

=== World Series of Poker Bracelet ===
Year	Tournament	Prize (US$)
2008	$10,000 Pot-Limit Hold'em World Championship	$794,112

As of 2025, his total live tournament winnings exceed $4,900,000. His eight cashes at the WSOP account for $912,048 of those winnings.

== See also ==
- List of University of Waterloo people
