= Saro Getzoyan =

American poker player and software engineer

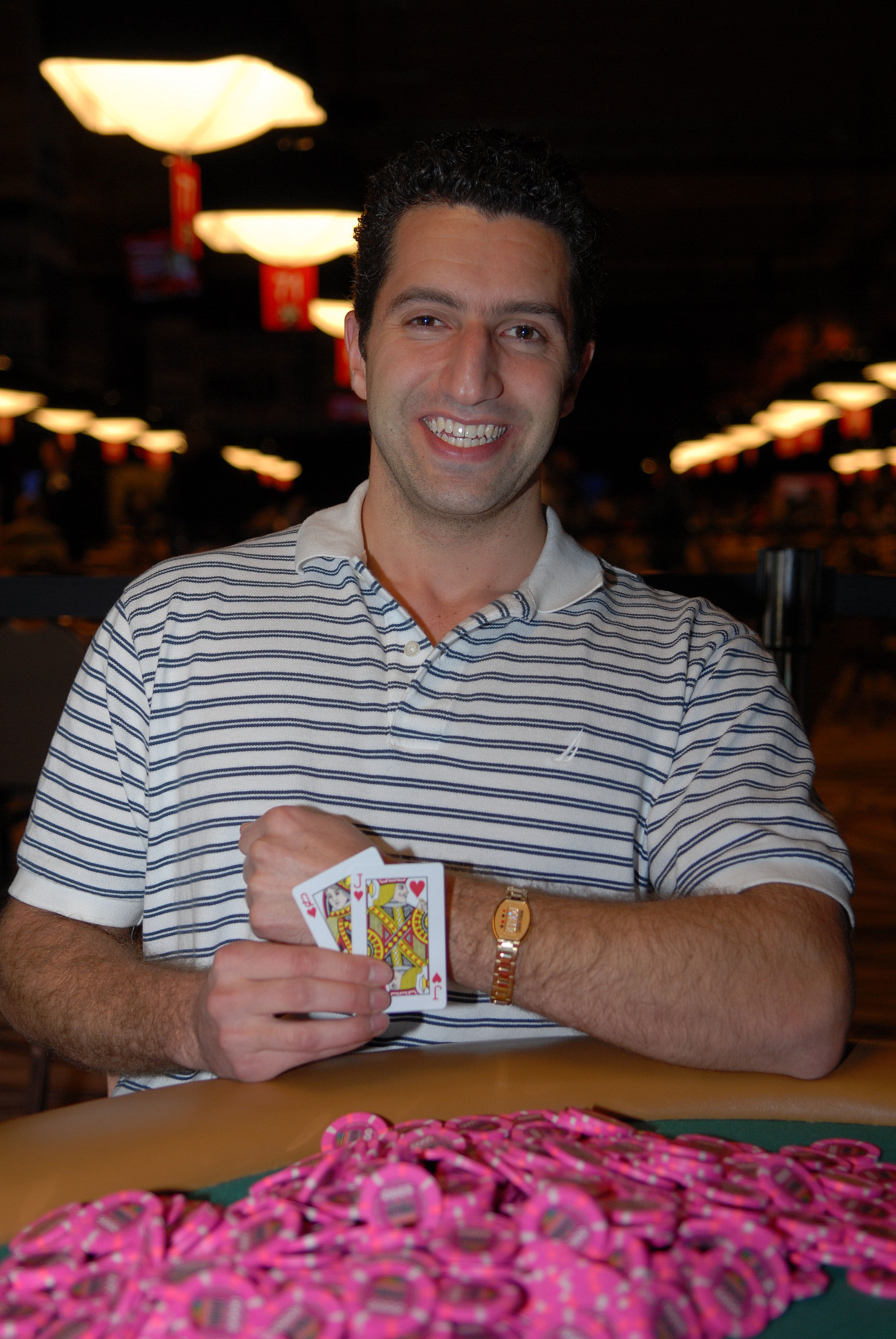
- Getzoyan at the 2007 World Series of Poker

World Series of Poker
- Bracelet: 1
- Money finish: 1
- Highest WSOP Main Event finish: None

Saro Getzoyan is an American software engineer from Lexington, Massachusetts who won a World Series of Poker bracelet in the 2007 $5,000 World Championship Limit Hold'em. Getzoyan, of Armenian descent, earned an undergraduate degree from Massachusetts Institute of Technology (MIT) and a master's degree from New York University.

Three weeks prior to the event, Getzoyan started a new job. The night before the final table Getzoyan was worried that if he missed work that he might be fired from his job. Getzoyan entered the final table as one of the short stacks, so he had figured out an alternative travel arrangement to make it back to Massachusetts without missing work. As he was not knocked out of the tournament, he missed his flight. An hour after the tournament was over he was booking his return trip. "Money doesn't change anything. That's just the way I am," he was reported as saying.

Getzoyan has tournament winnings of over $350,000.

== World Series of Poker bracelets ==
Year	Tournament	Prize (US$)
2007	$5,000 World Championship Limit Hold'em	$333,379
