= Tuan Lam =

Vietnamese-Canadian poker player (born 1966)

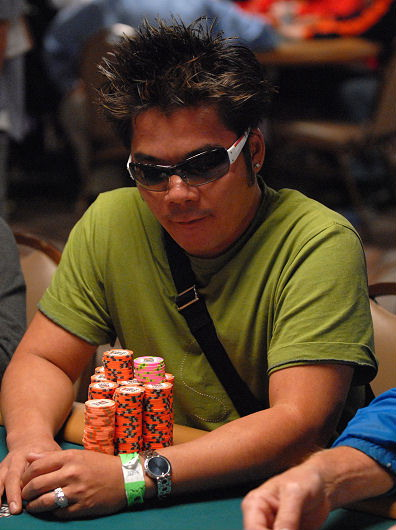
- Lam at the 2007 World Series of Poker
- Born: January 1, 1966 (age 60); Vietnam

World Series of Poker
- Bracelet: None
- Money finishes: 3
- Highest WSOP Main Event finish: 2nd, 2007

Tuan Lam (born January 1, 1966) is a Vietnamese-Canadian professional poker player from Mississauga, Ontario, Canada. Lam left Vietnam at age 17, ending up in an Indonesian refugee camp for two years where he learned English before making his way to Canada. Prior to turning professional, Lam worked as a general laborer for a metal company. He is now divorced and remarried with a third child.

Lam made the final table of the 2007 World Series of Poker Main Event, outlasting a field of 6,358 players and finishing second to Jerry Yang. His finish earned him $4,840,981. Prior to the Main Event, he had two previous cashes in the World Series, one in 2006 and the other in 2005. His 3 cashes at the WSOP have netted him a total of $4,851,424 in earnings.

Lam is a cash game player, playing $200/$400 limit hold'em games online. He was regularly seen at Brantford Charity Casino in Brantford, Ontario, but now plays at the Bellagio. Lam had disappeared from the poker scene, returned to Vietnam and was involved in various charity work there. He participated in the 2014 World Series of Poker and admits he lost some of his 2007 WSOP winnings online.
