= Alexander Kravchenko (poker player) =

Russian poker player (born 1971)

Alex Kravchenko
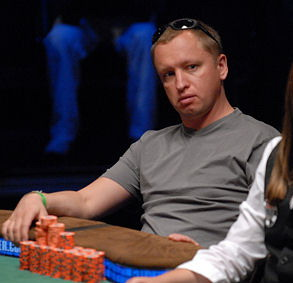
- Kravchenko at the 2007 World Series of Poker
- Born: 21 April 1971 (age 55); Arkhangelsk, Soviet Union

World Series of Poker
- Bracelet: 1
- Final tables: 7
- Money finishes: 32
- Highest WSOP Main Event finish: 4th, 2007

World Poker Tour
- Money finishes: 6

European Poker Tour
- Money finishes: 12

Alexander Kravchenko (Russian: Александр Кравченко; born 21 April 1971) is a professional poker player based in Moscow, Russia. In the 2007 World Series of Poker, he cashed six times, including finishing fourth at the Main Event and the $1,500 Limit Omaha Hi/Lo event where he won his first career WSOP bracelet. Kravchenko had some other notable cashes in 2007, including making the final table (finishing fifth) in the inaugural World Series of Poker Europe tournament, a £2,500 buy-in H.O.R.S.E. event, as well as finishing 3rd in the Moscow Millions, which featured the largest ever prizepool for a tournament held in Russia.

As a result of his success at the 2007 World Series of Poker, Kravchenko passed Kirill Gerasimov to become the all-time leading money winner among Russian players at the time. He is also the first Russian citizen to win a WSOP bracelet.

As of 2014, his live tournament winnings exceed $4,000,000. His 32 cashes at the WSOP account for $2,661,909 of those winnings.

== World Series of Poker bracelet ==
Year	Tournament	Prize (US$)
2007	$1,500 Omaha Hi/Lo Split 8 or Better	$228,446

== Online poker ==
On 27 September 2010, Kravchenko won Event #61 of the World Championship Of Online Poker (WCOOP), the $10,300 8-game [High-Roller] event. After playing in the two-day event in a field that started with 133 players, he won his first WCOOP bracelet along with $345,800 in prize money.
