= 2007 World Series of Poker =

Series of poker tournaments

- Location: Rio All-Suite Hotel and Casino, Las Vegas, Nevada
- Dates: June 1 – July 18

Champion
- (Laos) Jerry Yang

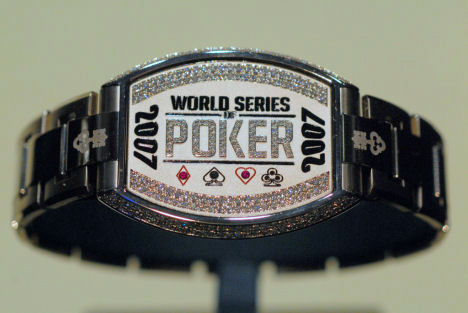
The 2007 WSOP Championship Bracelet

The 2007 World Series of Poker (WSOP) began on June 1, 2007. The $10,000 (US) no-limit Texas hold 'em Main Event began on July 6 and was completed on the morning of July 18. All events were held at the Rio All Suite Hotel and Casino in Las Vegas, Nevada, by Harrah's Entertainment, which has run the annual event since its purchase from the Binion family in 2004.

For the first time players began each event with double the amount of chips as the buy-in. This means that players in the Main Event started with 20,000 chips. The blind structure has also been increased and some blind levels removed but slowed to allow for more play.

In addition to the $50,000 H.O.R.S.E. event, which was first played at the 2006 World Series of Poker, this year there were 2 additional H.O.R.S.E. events with lower buy-ins ($2,500 and $5,000).

Tom Schneider, who won 2 events and made 1 other final table, won the Player of the Year Award. Michael Binger and Chad Brown led all other players with eight money finishes.

The annual celebrity event was changed this year, as it became a pro and celeb event called "Ante Up for Africa", hosted by actor Don Cheadle and poker pro Annie Duke. The final two players, Dan Shak and Brandon Moran, agreed to share first place and donate all prize money to charities in Darfur.

The last woman standing of the 2007 Main Event was Maria Ho who finished in 38th place.

Also this year, KEM Plastic Playing Cards were once again used for the events, rather than Copag brand plastic playing cards, which were used during the 2005 and 2006 World Series of Poker.

== Event schedule ==
Phil Hellmuth won his 11th career bracelet, breaking a tie with Doyle Brunson and Johnny Chan for the career bracelet lead.

#	Event	Entries	Winner	Prize	Runner-up	Results
1	$5,000 World Championship Mixed Hold'em	451	Steve Billirakis (1/1)	$536,287	Greg Mueller	Results
2	$500 Casino Employees No Limit Hold'em	1,039	Frederick Narciso (1/1)	$104,701	Charles Fisher	Results
3	$1,500 No Limit Hold'em	2,998	Ciaran O'Leary (1/1)	$727,012	Paul Evans	Results
4	$1,500 Pot Limit Hold'em	781	Mike Spegal (1/1)	$252,290	Gavin Smith	Results
5	$2,500 Omaha/Seven Card Stud Hi/Lo 8 or Better	327	Tom Schneider (1/1)	$214,347	Ed Tonnellier	Results
6	$1,500 Limit Hold'em	910	Gary Styczynski (1/1)	$280,715	Varouzhan Gumroyan	Results
7	$5,000 Pot Limit Omaha w/Rebuys	145	Burt Boutin (1/2)	$868,745	Erik Cajelais	Results
8	$1,000 No Limit Hold'em w/Rebuys	814	Michael Chu (1/1)	$585,744	Tom Vu	Results
9	$1,500 Omaha Hi/Lo Split 8 or Better	690	Alex Kravchenko (1/1)	$228,446	Bryan Devonshire	Results
10	$2,000 No Limit Hold'em	1,531	Will Durkee (1/1)	$566,916	Todd Terry	Results
11	$5,000 World Championship Seven Card Stud	180	Chris Reslock (1/1)	$258,453	Phil Ivey (0/5)	Results
12	$1,500 No Limit Hold'em Short Handed	1,427	Jason Warner (1/1)	$481,698	David Zeitlin	Results
13	$5,000 World Championship Pot Limit Hold'em	398	Allen Cunningham (1/5)	$487,287	Jeff Lisandro	Results
14	$1,500 Seven Card Stud	395	Michael Keiner (1/1)	$146,987	Nesbitt Coburn	Results
15	$1,500 No Limit Hold'em	2,628	Phil Hellmuth (1/11)	$637,254	Andy Philachack	Results
16	$2,500 H.O.R.S.E.	382	James Richburg (1/2)	$239,503	Walter Browne	Results
17	$1,000 World Championship Ladies No Limit Hold'em	1,286	Sally Boyer (1/1)	$262,077	Anne Heft	Results
18	$5,000 World Championship Limit Hold'em	257	Saro Getzoyan (1/1)	$333,379	Geoff Sanford	Results
19	$2,500 No Limit Hold'em	1,013	Francois Safieddine (1/1)	$521,785	John Phan	Results
20	$2,000 Seven Card Stud Hi/Lo 8 or Better	340	Ryan Hughes (1/1)	$176,358	Min Lee	Results
21	$1,500 No Limit Hold'em Shootout	900	Don Baruch (1/1)	$264,107	Jared Davis	Results
22	$5,000 No Limit Hold'em	640	James Mackey (1/1)	$730,740	Stuart Fox	Results
23	$1,500 Pot Limit Omaha	576	Scott Clements (1/2)	$194,206	Eric Lynch	Results
24	$3,000 World Championship Seven Card Stud Hi/Lo Split 8 or Better	236	Eli Elezra (1/1)	$198,984	Scotty Nguyen (0/4)	Results
25	$2,000 No Limit Hold'em	1,619	Ben Ponzio (1/1)	$599,467	David Hewitt	Results
26	$5,000 H.O.R.S.E.	192	Ralph Schwartz (1/1)	$275,683	Bill Gazes	Results
27	$1,500 No Limit Hold'em	2,315	David Stucke (1/1)	$603,069	Young Cho	Results
28	$3,000 No Limit Hold'em	827	Shankar Pillai (1/1)	$527,829	Beth Shak	Results
29	$1,500 Seven Card Razz	341	Katja Thater (1/1)	$132,653	Larry St. Jean	Results
30	$2,500 No Limit Hold'em Short Handed	847	Hoyt Corkins (1/2)	$515,065	Terrence Chan	Results
31	$5,000 World Championship Heads Up No Limit Hold'em	392	Dan Schreiber (1/1)	$425,594	Mark Muchnik	Results
32	$2,000 Seven Card Stud	213	Jeff Lisandro (1/1)	$118,426	Nick Frangos	Results
33	$1,500 Pot Limit Omaha w/Rebuys	293	Alan Smurfit (1/1)	$464,867	Qushqar Morad	Results
34	$3,000 Limit Hold'em	296	Alexander Borteh (1/1)	$225,483	Brandon Wong	Results
35	$1,500 No Limit Hold'em	2,541	Ryan Young (1/1)	$615,955	Dustin Dirksen	Results
36	$5,000 World Championship Omaha Hi/Lo Split 8 or Better	280	John Guth (1/1)	$363,216	Robert Stevanovski	Results
37	$2,000 Pot Limit Hold'em	599	Greg Hopkins (1/1)	$269,274	Jason Newburger	Results
38	$1,500 No Limit Hold'em	2,778	Robert Cheung (1/1)	$673,628	Richard Murnick	Results
39	$50,000 World Championship H.O.R.S.E.	148	Freddy Deeb (1/2)	$2,276,832	Bruno Fitoussi	Results
40	$1,500 Mixed Hold'em	620	Fred Goldberg (1/1)	$204,935	Rene Mouritsen	Results
41	$1,000 World Championship Seniors No Limit Hold'em	1,882	Ernest Bennett (1/1)	$348,423	Tony Korfman	Results
42	$1,500 Pot Limit Omaha Hi/Lo Split 8 or Better	687	Lukasz Dumanski (1/1)	$227,454	David Bach	Results
43	$2,000 Limit Hold'em	472	Saif Ahmad (1/1)	$217,329	William Jensen	Results
44	$2,000 Omaha Hi/Lo Split	534	Frankie O'Dell (1/2)	$240,057	Thang Luu	Results
45	$5,000 No Limit Hold'em Short Handed	728	Bill Edler (1/1)	$904,672	Alex Bolotin	Results
46	$1,000 Seven Card Stud Hi/Lo 8 or Better	668	Tom Schneider (2/2)	$147,713	Hoyt Verner	Results
47	$2,000 No Limit Hold'em	2,038	Blair Rodman (1/1)	$707,898	Amato Galasso	Results
48	$1,000 Limit 2-7 Triple Draw Lowball w/Rebuys	209	Rafi Amit (1/2)	$227,005	Lenny Martin	Results
49	$1,500 No Limit Hold'em	3,151	Chandrasekhar Billavara (1/1)	$722,914	Taylor Douglas	Results
50	$10,000 World Championship Pot Limit Omaha	314	Robert Mizrachi (1/1)	$768,889	Rene Mouritsen	Results
51	$1,000 S.H.O.E.	730	Dao Bac (1/1)	$157,975	Adam Geyer	Results
52	$1,000 No-Limit Hold'em w/Rebuys	1,048	Michael Graves (1/1)	$742,121	Theo Tran	Results
53	$1,500 Limit Hold'em Shootout	720	Ram Vaswani (1/1)	$217,438	Andy Ward	Results
54	$5,000 World Championship 2-7 Draw Lowball w/Rebuys	78	Erik Seidel (1/8)	$538,835	Chad Brown	Results
55	$10,000 World Championship No Limit Hold'em Main Event	6,358	Jerry Yang (1/1)	$8,250,000	Tuan Lam	Results

== 2007 records ==
- Steve Billirakis became the youngest person to ever win a WSOP bracelet at 21 years and 11 days. This record was broken three months later at the World Series of Poker Europe by Annette Obrestad, aged 18 years, 364 days.
- Phil Hellmuth became the first player to win 11 bracelets.
- Phil Hellmuth set a record of 63 all-time WSOP cashes.
- June 9 was the busiest WSOP day ever, with 3,009 participants starting in two events on the same day.
- The largest non-WSOP Main Event tournament record was broken. The $1500 Buy In No Limit Hold'em Event #49 attracted a record 3151 players for the noon start. This event broke the single busiest start date set on June 9.
- Annie Duke set the women's record with 33 WSOP cashes.
- 1,286 women set a new record for number of participants in an all women's poker tournament.
- The 2007 WSOP also boasted the largest number of total registrants in history, with 54,288 registrations for all of the events.
- Michael Binger and Chad Brown tied Chris Ferguson, Phil Hellmuth and Humberto Brenes for most ITM finishes in a single World Series of Poker with eight.

== Main Event ==
The $10,000 No Limit Hold'em Main Event began on July 6 with the first of four separate starting days. 6,358 players entered, 2,415 fewer than in 2006. This is the first time since 1992 that the Main Event experienced a reduction in participants. As the total number of registrants for the 2007 WSOP set a record at 54,288 with a total prize pool of $159,796,918 ($59,784,954 for the Main Event), the decrease in the number of participants in the Main Event has been attributed to a recent law that limits Internet gambling. As a result of this law, Harrah's did not allow online poker websites to directly purchase Main Event seats and offer them as prizes, if the sites conducted business with US citizens. Online entries to the Main Event that were won as prizes on Internet poker sites were a substantial contributor to the dramatic growth the Main Event seen in 2003, 2004, 2005 and 2006. The reduced field also meant a nearly one-third reduction in the Main Event's grand prize, from the record $12 million (US) in 2006 to $8.25 million.

A flatter payout structure was introduced in 2007 further reducing the prize money awarded to the final table finishers. Players who busted early in the money received a larger share than they would have in 2006. The lowest payouts in 2007 were $20,320 (just over double the buyin), as compared to $14,597 in 2006. Every player who made the final table in 2006 won over 1.5 million dollars.

A minor controversy arose during the main event. The colors of the chips made it very difficult to differentiate between the chip values. Pokernews.com posted the following note on its live reporting log, "It has literally been impossible for us to count these players' stacks due to the positioning of the cameras and the incredibly similar colors of the various chip denominations." Pokernews also reported that the chip color has affected play, "Because of the similarly-colored chips it took the dealer some time to count down Kluber's stack, and not long after Rahme began thinking about his response Kluber called the clock on him." Other players have complained that they can't count their opponents stacks and fear asking for a chip count as speaking may reveal the strength of their hand.

=== Final table ===
Name	Number of chips (percentage of total)	WSOP Bracelets*	WSOP Cashes*	WSOP Earnings*
(Denmark) Phillip Hilm	22,070,000 (17.3%)	0	1	$6,930
(Canada) Tuan Lam	21,315,000 (16.7%)	0	2	$10,443
(United Kingdom) Jon Kalmar	20,320,000 (15.9%)	0	1	$91,950
(South Africa) Raymond Rahme	16,320,000 (12.8%)	0	0	0
(United States) Lee Childs	13,240,000 (10.4%)	0	0	0
(United States) Lee Watkinson	9,925,000 (7.8%)	1	9	$1,283,185
(United States) Hevad Khan	9,205,000 (7.2%)	0	2	$20,255
(Laos) Jerry Yang	8,450,000 (6.6%)	0	0	0
(Russia) Alex Kravchenko	6,570,000 (5.2%)	1	6	$278,844

*Career statistics prior to the beginning of the 2007 Main Event.

=== Final table results ===
Place	Name	Prize
1st	Jerry Yang	$8,250,000
2nd	Tuan Lam	$4,840,981
3rd	Raymond Rahme	$3,048,025
4th	Alex Kravchenko	$1,852,721
5th	Jon Kalmar	$1,255,069
6th	Hevad Khan	$956,243
7th	Lee Childs	$705,229
8th	Lee Watkinson	$585,699
9th	Phillip Hilm	$525,934

=== Other notable high finishes ===
NB: This list is restricted to top 100 finishers with an existing Wikipedia entry.

Place	Name	Prize
11th	Scotty Nguyen	$476,926
16th	Kenny Tran	$381,302
23rd	Bill Edler	$333,490
25th	Daniel Alaei	$333,490
26th	Roy Winston	$333,490
38th	Maria Ho	$237,865
39th	Rep Porter	$237,865
42nd	Dag Mikkelsen	$237,865
56th	Kirk Morrison	$154,194
60th	John Spadavecchia	$154,194
61st	Gus Hansen	$154,194
64th	Julian Gardner	$130,288
69th	Brandon Adams	$130,288
73rd	Huck Seed	$106,382
77th	Willie Tann	$106,382
83rd	Humberto Brenes	$82,476
96th	Dario Minieri	$67,535

=== Performance of past champions ===
Name	Championship Year(s)	Day of Elimination
Thomas "Amarillo Slim" Preston	1972	1
Doyle Brunson	1976, 1977	1
Bobby Baldwin	1978	2
Tom McEvoy	1983	2
Berry Johnston	1986	4 (113th)
Johnny Chan	1987, 1988	1
Phil Hellmuth	1989	1
Brad Daugherty	1991	1
Jim Bechtel	1993	2
Dan Harrington	1995	2
Huck Seed	1996	5 (73rd)
Scotty Nguyen	1998	6 (11th)
Chris Ferguson	2000	3
Carlos Mortensen	2001	4 (217th)
Robert Varkonyi	2002	4 (177th)
Chris Moneymaker	2003	2
Greg Raymer	2004	1
Joe Hachem	2005	2
Jamie Gold	2006	1

=== Celebrities in the 2007 Main Event ===
- Out in Day 1: Kirk Acevedo, Hank Azaria, José Canseco, Steve Davis, Shannon Elizabeth, Janet Gretzky, Norm Macdonald, AJ McLean, Nelly, Ray Romano, Teddy Sheringham, Maxime Talbot, Antonio Tarver, Jennifer Tilly
- Out in Day 2: Jason Alexander, Rene Angelil, Tomas Brolin, Brad Garrett, Rick Salomon, Rick Tocchet, Montel Williams
- Out in Day 3: Todd Phillips (380th place, $34,644)
- Out in Day 4: Sam Simon (329th place, $39,445), Tobey Maguire (292nd place, $39,445), Sully Erna (237th place, $45,422)

== World Series of Poker Europe ==
Under the leadership of WSOP commissioner, Jeffrey Pollack, the World Series of Poker Europe (WSOPE) is the first expansion of the World Series of Poker. In September 2007, the first WSOP championship events outside of Las Vegas took place in London. It was the first time that WSOP bracelets were awarded outside of Las Vegas. Three tournaments were held, with the main event being a £10,000 buy-in no-limit hold 'em tournament. The main event was won by Norwegian online prodigy Annette Obrestad, who won on the day before her 19th birthday and became the youngest person ever to win a WSOP bracelet.

== See also ==
- 2007 World Series of Poker results
