= Francois Safieddine =

American poker player

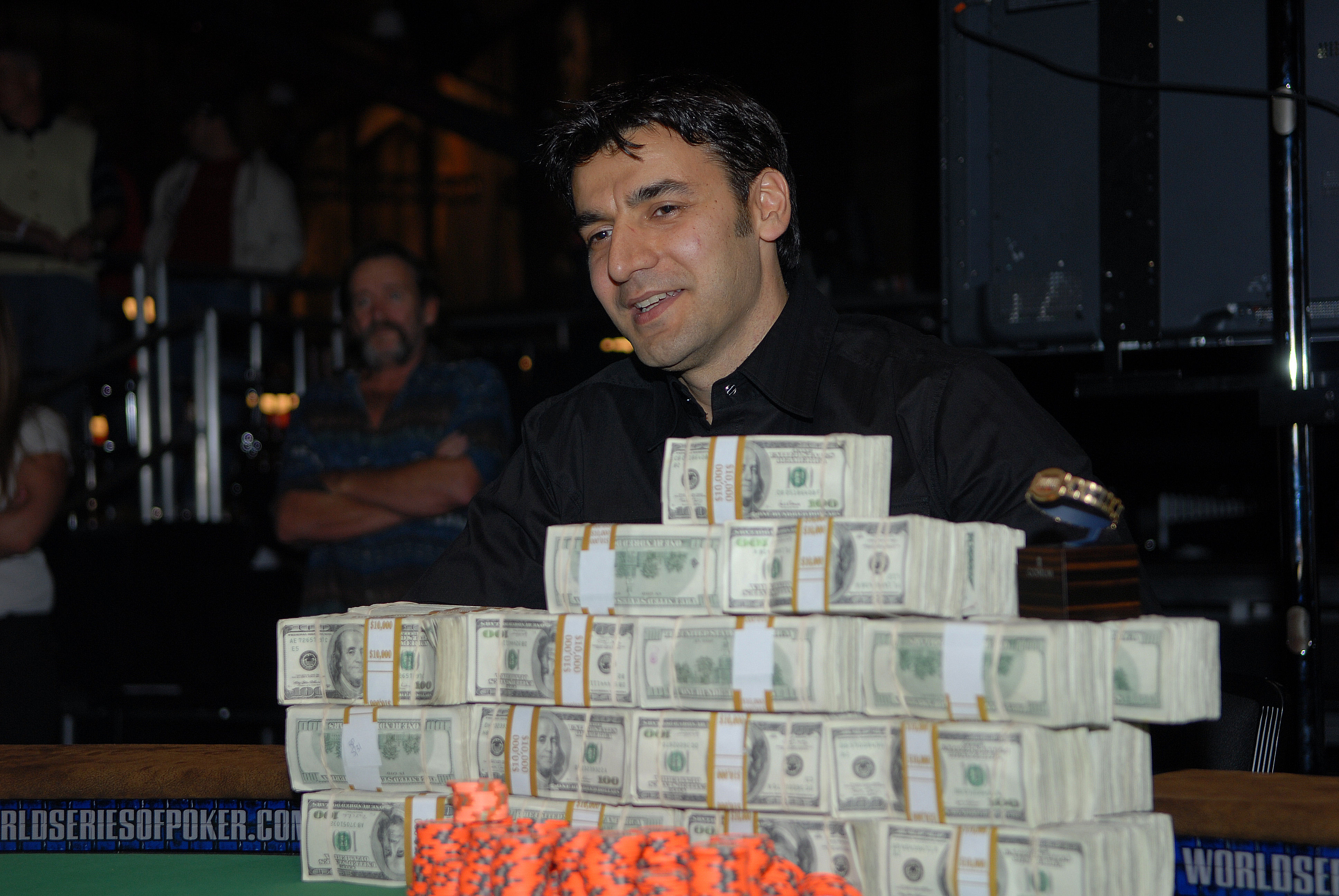
- Safieddine at the 2007 World Series of Poker

World Series of Poker
- Bracelet: 1
- Money finishes: 6
- Highest WSOP Main Event finish: 90, 2007

World Poker Tour
- Title: None
- Final table: None
- Money finishes: 3

Francois Safieddine is the owner of Viewhouse chain of restaurants in Denver & Colorado Springs and a nightclub owner in Denver, Colorado, who won a World Series of Poker bracelet at the 2007 World Series of Poker's $2,500 No-Limit Hold'em event. Safieddine, 55, is now divorced and has four children with his former wife. He is expecting his fifth child with his current Swedish girlfriend Linda. He was born in Lebanon and moved to the United States during the 1980s.

As of 2015, Francois Safieddine has tournament winning of over $1,800,000. His 11 cashes at the WSOP account for $738,562 of those winnings.

== World Series of Poker bracelets ==
Year	Tournament	Prize (US$)
2007	$2,500 No Limit Hold'em	$521,785
