= Freddy Deeb =

Lebanese poker player (born 1955)

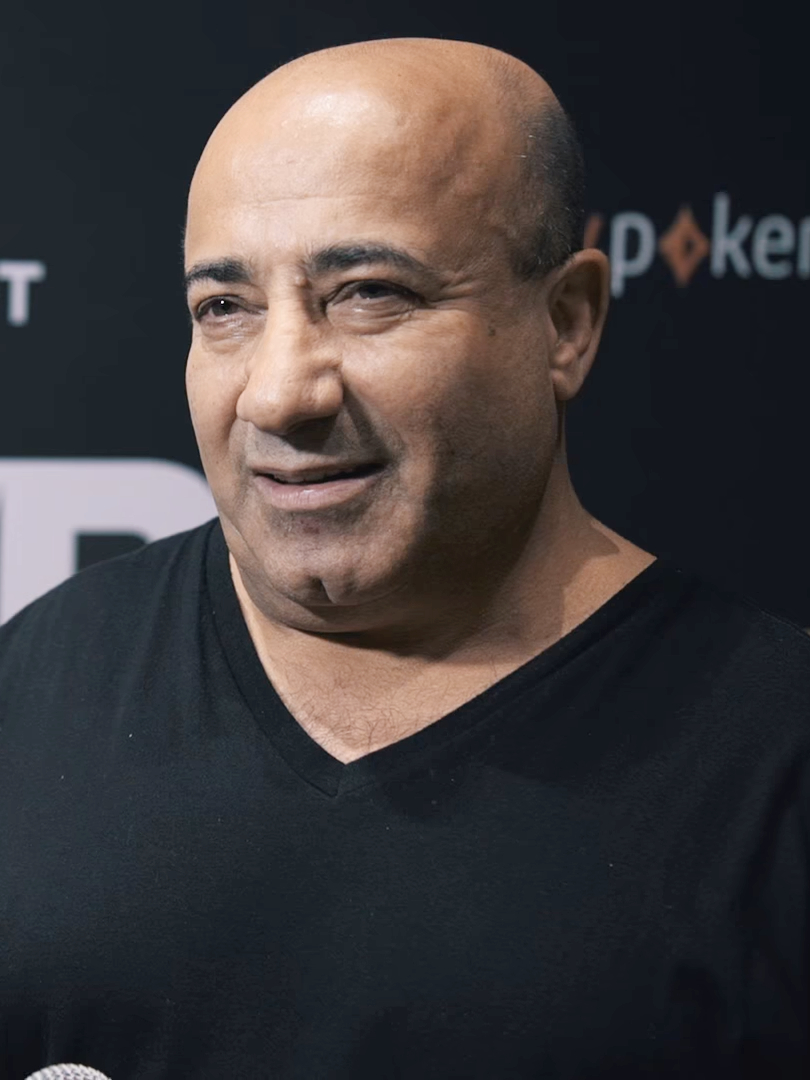
- Deeb in 2016
- Nicknames: Freddy, Fast Freddy
- Born: 27 November 1955 (age 70)

World Series of Poker
- Bracelets: 2
- Final tables: 15
- Money finishes: 41
- Highest WSOP Main Event finish: 13th, 2003

World Poker Tour
- Titles: 2
- Final tables: 7
- Money finishes: 20

European Poker Tour
- Title: None
- Final table: None
- Money finishes: 3

Kassem Ibrahim "Freddy" Deeb (Arabic: قاسم إبراهيم ديب; born 27 November 1955 in Beirut, Lebanon) is a Lebanese professional poker player.

== Early life ==
Deeb was attending Utah State University when civil war broke out in Lebanon in 1975. He lost contact with his parents (who had been sending him money to support his education) for two years. Deeb was unable to gain employment due to the restrictions of his student visa, so he began gambling. Deeb was forced to leave school, just 12 credits away from graduating with a degree in mechanical engineering.

== Poker career ==
At the 1996 World Series of Poker (WSOP), Deeb won the $5,000 Deuce to Seven Draw event, receiving $146,250 and besting a field that also contained Mickey Appleman, Gabe Kaplan, David Grey, and Doyle Brunson. He also finished in the money of the World Series of Poker Main Event twice, placing 17th in the 1995 World Series of Poker and 13th in the 2003 World Series of Poker.

Deeb won the Season 4 World Poker Tour (WPT) Ultimate Poker Classic event, where he won $1,000,000, and has also appeared in the Poker Superstars Invitational Tournament series and in the GSN series, High Stakes Poker.

As of June 2026, Deeb's total live tournament winnings exceed $9.2 million. His 41 cashes at the WSOP account for $3,723,334 of those winnings.

=== $50,000 World Championship H.O.R.S.E. ===
On 29 June 2007, Deeb won the $50,000 H.O.R.S.E. event at the 2007 World Series of Poker winning $2,276,832. During five-handed play, Deeb was down to his last $365,000 in chips, but managed to recover and win the WSOP bracelet. Deeb said that he did not appreciate his first bracelet because he did not recognize what it meant. “But this one – it means everything to me. These are the toughest players in the world. It has the highest buy-in. Except for the $10,000 buy-in (Main Event), this is the bracelet that means the most of any of them.”

=== World Series of Poker bracelets ===
Year	Tournament	Prize (US$)
1996	$5,000 Deuce to Seven Draw	$146,250
2007	$50,000 H.O.R.S.E.	$2,276,832
