= Chandrasekhar Billavara =

American poker player

- Nickname: Sako

World Series of Poker
- Bracelet: 1
- Money finishes: 3
- Highest WSOP Main Event finish: None

World Poker Tour
- Title: None
- Final table: None
- Money finish: None

Chandrasekhar Billavara is a poker player who won a World Series of Poker (WSOP) bracelet in a $1,500 No-Limit Hold'em event.

Billavara is the first Indian born WSOP bracelet winner.

Billavara competes in a weekly home game with friends. He jokes that he looks forward to confronting his friends by stating, “Now, I will look at them and say – are you trying to bluff me? Are you crazy? Look at this gold bracelet on my wrist! You want to try [to] bluff me?”

As of 2010, Billavara had tournament winnings of over $740,000. His three cashes at the WSOP accounted for $734,607 of those winnings.

== World Series of Poker bracelets ==
Year	Tournament	Prize (US$)
2007	$1,500 No-Limit Hold'em	$722,914
