= Michael Graves (poker player) =

American poker player (born 1984)

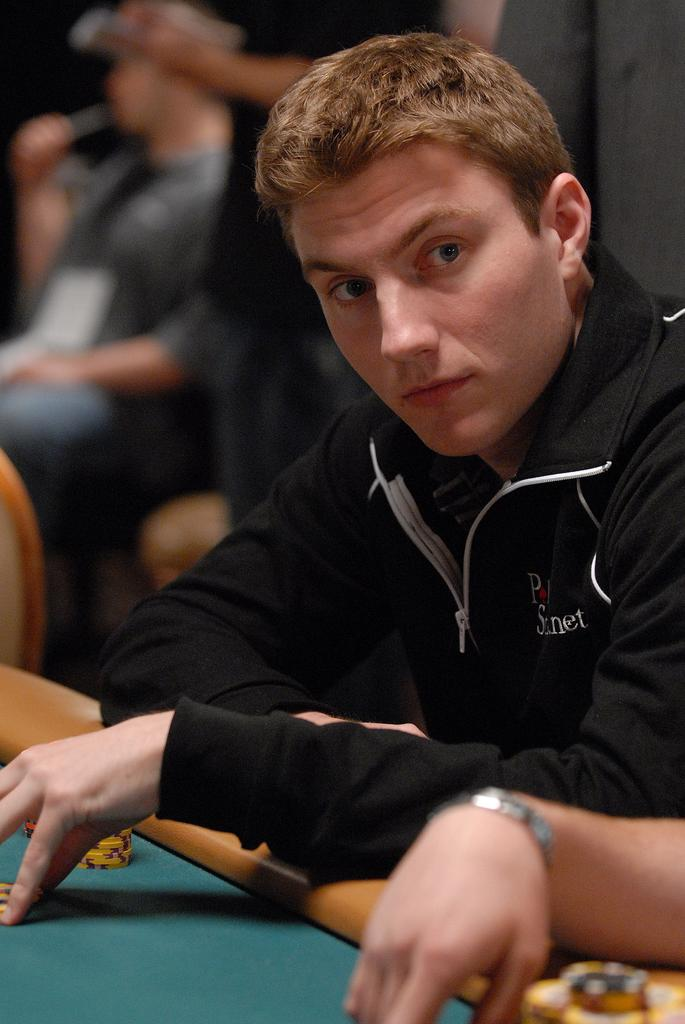
- Graves at the 2007 World Series of Poker
- Born: 1984 (age 41–42)

World Series of Poker
- Bracelet: 1
- Money finish: 1
- Highest WSOP Main Event finish: None

Michael Graves (born 1984) is an American poker player and was a medical student at the University of Texas-Southwestern. In 2007, he won a World Series of Poker bracelet in the $1,000 no limit Texas hold'em with rebuys. His victory created a buzz during the 2007 WSOP as this was the first time he cashed at the WSOP.

As of 2010, Graves live tournament winning exceed $750,000.

He is now a specialized board-certified Dermatologist practicing medicine in Austin, Texas.

== World Series of Poker bracelets ==
Year	Tournament	Prize (US$)
2007	$1,000 No-Limit Hold'em w/Rebuys	$742,121
