= Ben Ponzio =

American poker player (born 1975)

- Ponzio at the 2007 World Series of Poker
- Nicknames: Bumper, Large Fries, Godfadda

World Series of Poker
- Bracelet: 1
- Money finishes: 7
- Highest WSOP Main Event finish: None

Alessandro Ben Ponzio (born 1975) sells radio advertising for Chicago's WTMX-FM, WSHE-FM, and WDRV-FM radio. In 2007, he won a World Series of Poker bracelet in the $2,000 No-Limit Hold’em. “Sure, I’m going back to work,” Ponzio said in a post-tournament interview. “Six-hundred thousand (dollars) is a lot of money. But it’s not enough to live on the rest of my life.”

Ben nearly repeated his performance in 2008, finishing 5th in Event 40 of the 2008 WSOP. He also finished 10th in Event 50 in the 2009 WSOP, giving him 3 top 10 finishes in 3 years. As of 2016, Ben Ponzio has tournament winnings of nearly $700,000 with four top 10 World Series of Poker finishes.

In addition to poker and radio, Ben is President of the Sheridan Carroll Food Pantry in Chicago. More commonly known as www.feedchicago.org, this food pantry feeds over 200 families each month.

== World Series of Poker bracelets ==
Year	Tournament	Prize (US$)
2007	$2,000 No-Limit Hold'em	$ 599,109
