= Jerry Yang (poker player) =

Hmong-born American poker player (born 1967)

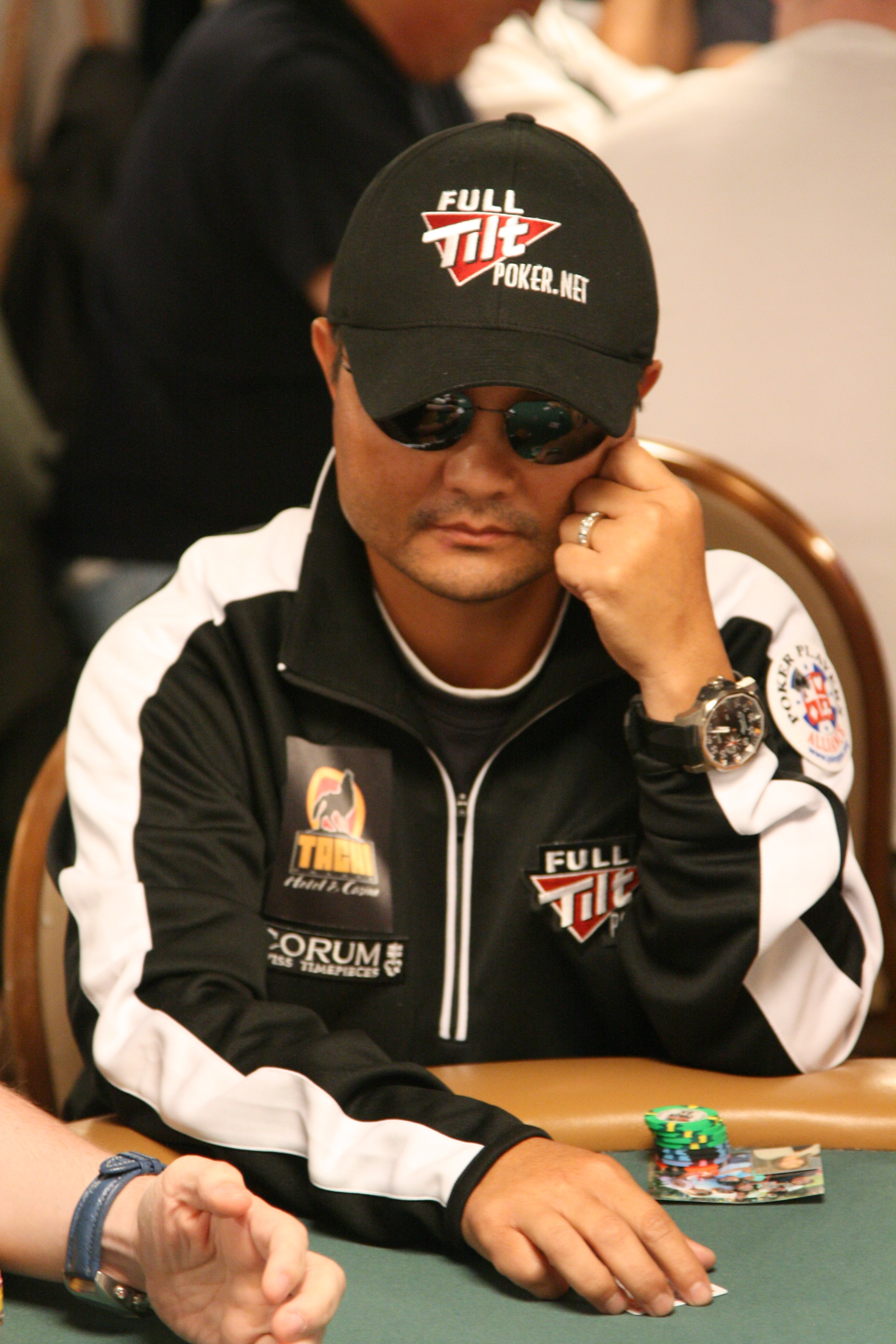
- Yang at the 2008 World Series of Poker
- Nickname: The Shadow
- Born: Xao Yang; 1967 (age 58–59); Vientiane, Laos

World Series of Poker
- Bracelet: 1
- Money finishes: 6
- Highest WSOP Main Event finish: Winner, 2007

Xao "Jerry" Yang (born 1967) is an ethnic Hmong American poker player from Temecula, California and the 2007 World Series of Poker Main Event champion.

Yang started playing poker in 2005. An amateur player at the time, Yang entered the 2007 World Series of Poker after winning a $225 satellite at the Pechanga Resort and Casino in Temecula. Prior to the World Series, he had four cashes in local California events. At the final table, Yang went from starting eighth in chips to holding a big chip lead that he never relinquished. The process of accumulating this chip lead involved Yang knocking out seven of the eight other players at the final table.

Heads-up against Tuan Lam, he won the title with 8♣ 8♦ against Lam's A♦ Q♦ when he hit a nine-high straight on the river after Lam had caught a queen on the flop on a board of 5♠ Q♣ 9♣ 7♦ 6♥. After a 12-hour final table, Yang won $8,250,000 for the victory. As he did with other players at the final table, he proceeded to inform Lam that he had a "friend for life". As of 2014, the majority of his live tournament winnings, $8,437,435, resulted from his win at the 2007 Main Event.

Yang summarized his tournament strategy: "I study my opponents very carefully, and when I sensed something, when I sensed some weakness, I took a chance. Even if I had nothing, I decided to raise, reraise, push all-in or make a call....The only way that I could win this tournament was by being aggressive from the very beginning and that’s exactly what I did. And thank God I was also able to pick up some good cards at the same time." Once Yang was guaranteed a share of the prize money, he pledged to donate 10% of his winnings to three charities (the Make-a-Wish Foundation, Feed The Children, and the Ronald McDonald House), as well as his alma mater, Loma Linda University.

As of 2016, Yang's live tournament winnings exceed $8,400,000.

== Personal life ==
Yang, an ethnic Hmong, was born in Laos. When the communists took control of that country in the 1970s, his family escaped to Thailand where they spent four years in a refugee camp. While living in the camp, a brother and sister of his died.

Yang currently owns a sushi restaurant in Fresno, California. Yang holds a master's degree in health psychology from Loma Linda University and worked as a psychotherapist and social worker.

He is married and has six children.
