= World Poker Tour season 5 results =

Below are the results of season five of the World Poker Tour (2006–2007). Following on from his win in the 2001 World Series of Poker Main Event Carlos Mortensen won the 2007 WPT Championship. This meant he became the first player to win both the World Series of Poker Main Event and WPT Championship.

== Results ==
=== Mirage Poker Showdown ===
- Casino: The Mirage, Las Vegas
- Buy-in: $10,000
- 4-Day Event: May 14, 2006 to May 17, 2006
- Number of Entries: 384
- Total Prize Pool: $3,724,800
- Number of Payouts: 36
- Winning Hand: K♠ 5♦

Final Table
Place	Name	Prize
1st	Stanley Weiss	$1,320,255
2nd	Harry Demetriou	$673,272
3rd	Devin Porter	$332,937
4th	David Williams	$221,958
5th	Steve Frederick	$166,469
6th	Robert Mizrachi	$129,476

=== Mandalay Bay Poker Championship ===
- Casino: Mandalay Bay, Las Vegas
- Buy-in: $10,000
- 5-Day Event: June 4, 2006 to June 8, 2006
- Number of Entries: 349
- Total Prize Pool: $3,385,300
- Number of Payouts: 50
- Winning Hand: 9♣ 8♥

Final Table
Place	Name	Prize
1st	Joe Tehan	$1,033,440
2nd	Burt Boutin	$604,765
3rd	Brad Booth	$319,180
4th	Alex Outhred	$184,745
5th	Al Stonum	$134,390
6th	Steve Vincent	$94,075

=== Grand Prix de Paris ===
- Casino: Aviation Club de France, Paris
- Buy-in: €10,000
- 5-Day Event: June 12, 2006 to June 16, 2006
- Number of Entries: 232
- Total Prize Pool: €2,320,000 ($2,805,856)
- Number of Payouts: 27
- Winning Hand: 6♥ 6♦

Final Table
Place	Name	Prize
1st	Christian Grundtvig	€712,500 ($907,066)
2nd	Jani Sointula	€356,250 ($453,533)
3rd	Thomas Wahlroos	€243,750 ($310,312)
4th	Henrik Witt	€168,750 ($214,831)
5th	Philip Yeh	€131,250 ($167,091)
6th	Patrick Schuhl	€93,750 ($119,351)

=== Legends of Poker ===
- Casino: Bicycle Casino, Los Angeles
- Buy-in: $10,000
- 5-Day Event: August 26, 2006 to August 30, 2006
- Number of Entries: 466
- Total Prize Pool: $4,520,200
- Number of Payouts: 45
- Winning Hand: A♣ 7♣

Final Table
Place	Name	Prize
1st	Joe Pelton	$1,602,670
2nd	Frankie O'Dell	$776,385
3rd	Hoyt Corkins	$381,540
4th	Kevin O'Donnell	$226,260
5th	Randy Holland	$177,460
6th	Scotty Nguyen	$133,095

=== Borgata Poker Open ===
- Casino: Borgata, Atlantic City
- Buy-in: $10,000
- 5-Day Event: September 15, 2006 to September 19, 2006
- Number of Entries: 540
- Total Prize Pool: $5,238,000
- Number of Payouts: 54
- Winning Hand: Q♦ Q♥

Final Table
Place	Name	Prize
1st	Mark Newhouse	$1,519,020
2nd	Chris McCormack	$802,985
3rd	David Sklansky	$419,040
4th	Anthony Argila	$366,660
5th	Chris Bell	$314,280
6th	Blaise Ingoglia	$261,901

=== Festa Al Lago ===
- Casino: Bellagio, Las Vegas
- Buy-in: $10,000
- 5-Day Event: October 16, 2006 to October 20, 2006
- Number of Entries: 433
- Total Prize Pool: $4,200,100
- Number of Payouts: 100
- Winning Hand: 2♦ 2♥

Final Table
Place	Name	Prize
1st	Andreas Walnum	$1,090,025
2nd	Steve Wong	$542,700
3rd	Joe Pelton	$292,220
4th	Christopher Loveland	$187,745
5th	David Baker	$125,240
6th	Can Kim Hua	$83,490

=== Canadian Open Championship ===
- Casino: Fallsview Casino Resort, Niagara Falls, Ontario, Canada
- Buy-in: Can$2,500
- 3-Day Event: October 22, 2006 to October 24, 2006
- Number of Entries: 298
- Total Prize Pool: Can$720,533 (US$639,913)
- Number of Payouts: 27

Final Table
Place	Name	Prize
1st	Scott Clements	Can$250,027 (US$222,524)
2nd	Anthony O'Hagan	Can$115,285 (US$102,385)
3rd	Vince Sessa	Can$61,245 (US$554,392)
4th	Terris Preston	Can$43,232 (US$38,395)
5th	Steven Buttery	Can$32,424 (US$28,796)
6th	Gia Trinh	Can$25,219 (US$22,397)

=== North American Poker Championship ===
- Casino: Fallsview Casino Resort, Niagara Falls, Ontario, Canada
- Buy-in: Can$10,000
- 5-Day Event: October 25, 2006 to October 29, 2006
- Number of Entries: 497
- Total Prize Pool: Can$4,829,332 (US$4,288,965)
- Number of Payouts: 45
- Winning Hand: K♥ 2♦

Final Table
Place	Name	Prize
1st	Soren Turkewitsch	Can$1,380,378 (US$1,225,920)
2nd	Jason Sagle	Can$676,107 (US$600,456)
3rd	John Lam	Can$352,541 (US$313,094)
4th	Jim Worth	Can$289,760 (US$257,338)
5th	John Juanda	Can$217,320 (US$193,003)
6th	Marc Karam	Can$169,027 (US$150,114)

=== World Poker Finals ===
- Casino: Foxwoods, Mashantucket, Connecticut
- Buy-in: $10,000
- 4-Day Event: November 12, 2006 to November 16, 2006
- Number of Entries: 609
- Total Prize Pool: $5,749,481
- Number of Payouts: 60
- Winning Hand: 7♣ 5♥

Final Table
Place	Name	Prize
1st	Nenad Medic	$1,717,194
2nd	EG Harvin	$904,389
3rd	Mimi Tran	$472,228
4th	Michael Omelchuk	$343,439
5th	Kathy Liebert	$257,579
6th	Michael Perry	$200,340

=== Doyle Brunson North American Poker Classic ===
- Casino: Bellagio, Las Vegas
- Buy-in: $15,000
- 6-Day Event: December 14, 2006 to December 19, 2006
- Number of Entries: 583
- Total Prize Pool: $8,482,650
- Number of Payouts: 100
- Winning Hand: A♠ 6♣

Final Table
Place	Name	Prize
1st	Joseph Hachem	$2,207,575
2nd	Jim Hanna	$1,099,430
3rd	Daniel Negreanu	$592,000
4th	Mads Andersen	$380,630
5th	David Redlin	$253,715
6th	Edward Jordan	$169,145

=== PokerStars Caribbean Adventure ===
- Casino: Atlantis, Paradise Island
- Buy-in: $7,800
- 6-Day Event: January 5, 2007 to January 10, 2007
- Number of Entries: 937
- Total Prize Pool: $7,063,842
- Number of Payouts: 180
- Winning Hand: A♦ 10♥

Final Table
Place	Name	Prize
1st	Ryan Daut	$1,535,255
2nd	Isaac Haxton	$861,789
3rd	Robert Ford	$550,980
4th	Robert Mizrachi	$409,703
5th	Jonathan Little	$317,873
6th	Frank Rusnak	$247,234

=== World Poker Open ===
- Casino: Gold Strike Tunica
- Buy-in: $10,000
- 5-Day Event: January 21, 2007 to January 25, 2007
- Number of Entries: 294
- Total Prize Pool: $2,812,000
- Number of Payouts: 27
- Winning Hand: 8♣ 8♦

Final Table
Place	Name	Prize
1st	Bryan Sumner	$913,986
2nd	Daniel Negreanu	$502,691
3rd	Young Cho	$257,058
4th	Gary Kainer	$199,934
5th	Kido Pham	$171,372
6th	J.C. Tran	$142,810

=== Borgata Winter Poker Open ===
- Casino: Borgata, Atlantic City
- Buy-in: $10,000
- 5-Day Event: January 26, 2007 to January 30, 2007
- Number of Entries: 571
- Total Prize Pool: $5,529,000
- Number of Payouts: 54
- Winning Hand: A♣ 5♥

Final Table
Place	Name	Prize
1st	John Hennigan	$1,606,223
2nd	Chuck Kelley	$849,082
3rd	John Gale	$443,096
4th	Joe Simmons	$387,709
5th	Michael Sukonik	$332,322
6th	Jon James	$276,935

=== L.A. Poker Classic ===
- Casino: Commerce Casino, Los Angeles
- Buy-in: $10,000
- 6-Day Event: February 24. 2007 to March 1, 2007
- Number of Entries: 791
- Total Prize Pool: $7,593,600
- Number of Payouts: 54
- Winning Hand: J♦ 6♦

Final Table
Place	Name	Prize
1st	Eric Hershler	$2,429,970
2nd	J.C. Tran	$1,177,010
3rd	Jacobo Fernandez	$607,490
4th	Paul Wasicka	$455,615
5th	Chau Giang	$341,710
6th	David Bach	$257,425

=== WPT Celebrity Invitational ===
- Casino: Commerce Casino, Los Angeles
- Buy-in:
- 2-Day Event: March 3, 2007
- Number of Entries: 420
- Total Prize Pool: $200,000
- Number of Payouts:
- Winning Hand: A♥ J♥

Final Table
Place	Name	Prize
1st	Adam Weinraub	$100,000
2nd	John Cernuto	$50,000
3rd	Timothy West	$20,000
4th	David Mosikian	$15,000
5th	Nick Cassavetes	$10,000
6th	Glenn Morshower	$5,000

=== Bay 101 Shooting Star ===
- Casino: Bay 101, San Jose, California
- Buy-in: $10,000
- 5-Day Event: March 12, 2007 to March 16, 2007
- Number of Entries: 450
- Total Prize Pool: $4,490,000
- Number of Payouts: 45
- Winning Hand: 7♣ 7♦

Final Table
Place	Name	Prize
1st	Ted Forrest	$1,100,000
2nd	J. J. Liu	$600,000
3rd	Amir Shayesteh	$314,500
4th	James Van Alstyne	$250,000
5th	Vince Shaw	$200,000
6th	Bill Edler	$160,000

=== World Poker Challenge ===
- Casino: Reno Hilton, Reno
- Buy-in: $5,000
- 4-Day Event: March 25, 2007 to March 28, 2007
- Number of Entries: 475
- Total Prize Pool: $2,278,250
- Number of Payouts: 45
- Winning Hand: 10♠ 10♣

Final Table
Place	Name	Prize
1st	J.C. Tran	$683,473
2nd	Juan Carlos Alvarado	$366,798
3rd	David Pham	$182,260
4th	Mark Seif	$159,478
5th	John Hom	$136,695
6th	Danny Wong	$113,913

=== Foxwoods Poker Classic ===
- Casino: Foxwoods, Mashantucket, Connecticut
- Buy-in: $10,000
- 6-Day Event: March 30, 2007 to April 4, 2007
- Number of Entries: 415
- Total Prize Pool: $3,898,635
- Number of Payouts: 40
- Winning Hand: 6♠ 4♥

Final Table
Place	Name	Prize
1st	Raj Patel	$1,298,405
2nd	Paul Matteo	$643,275
3rd	Antonio Cavezza	$370,370
4th	Fred Goldberg	$233,918
5th	Seth Berger	$175,439
6th	Allen Kessler	$136,452

=== WPT Championship ===
- Casino: Bellagio, Las Vegas
- Buy-in: $25,000
- 7-Day Event: April 21, 2007 to April 27, 2007
- Number of Entries: 639
- Total Prize Pool: $15,495,750
- Number of Payouts: 100
- Winning Hand: K♥ J♥

Final Table
Place	Name	Prize
1st	Carlos Mortensen	$3,970,415
2nd	Kirk Morrison	$2,011,135
3rd	Paul Lee	$1,082,920
4th	Guy Laliberté	$696,220
5th	Tim Phan	$464,110
6th	Mike Wattel	$309,405

== Other Events ==
During season 5 of the WPT there was one special event that did not apply to the Player of the Year standings:

- The WPT Celebrity Invitational - March 3–5, 2007 - Commerce Casino - postscript to Event #14: L.A. Poker Classic
