= David Stucke =

American poker player and physics professor (born 1974)

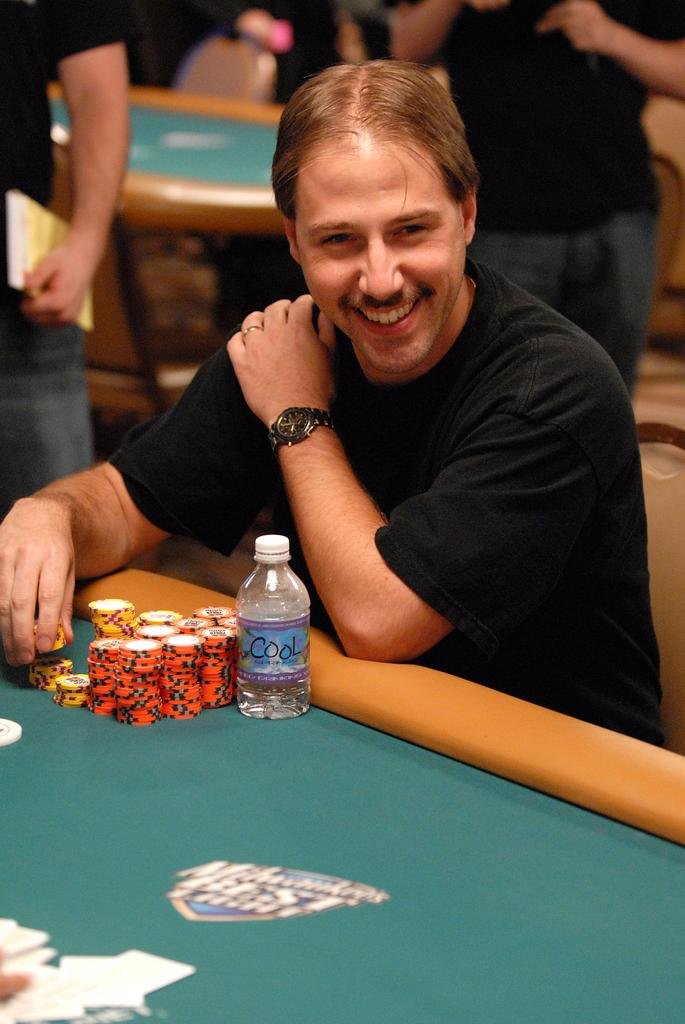
- Stucke at the 2007 World Series of Poker
- Nickname: Doc
- Born: April 9, 1974 (age 52); Erie, Pennsylvania, U.S.

World Series of Poker
- Bracelet: 1
- Money finishes: 4
- Highest WSOP Main Event finish: 510, 2008

David Stucke (born April 9, 1974) is a physics professor and poker player.

He graduated from Carnegie Mellon University, and received advanced degrees from Iowa State University and Pennsylvania State University. He lives in Henderson, Nevada.

In 2007, he won a World Series of Poker bracelet in a $1,500 No-Limit Hold’em event in the first WSOP tournament he ever entered.

As of 2008, Stucke has tournament winnings of over $649,000.

== World Series of Poker bracelets ==
Year	Tournament	Prize (US$)
2007	$1,500 No-Limit Hold’em	$603,069
