= Robert Cheung =

Hong Kong-born Canadian poker player

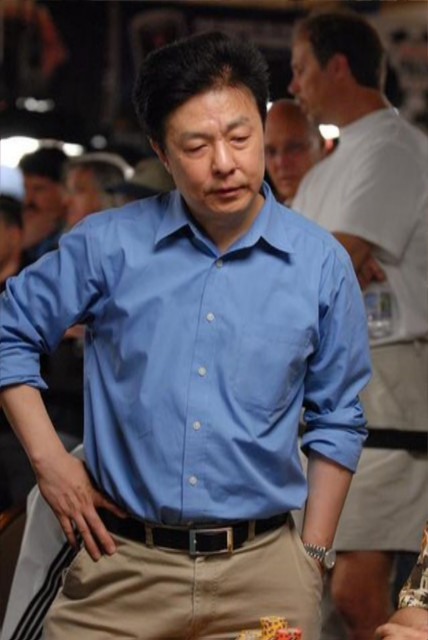
- Cheung at the 2007 World Series of Poker
- Nickname: RCW

World Series of Poker
- Bracelet: 1
- Money finishes: 35
- Highest WSOP Main Event finish: 861

World Poker Tour
- Title: None
- Final table: None
- Money finishes: 2

Robert Cheung is a Canadian poker player and businessman based in Vancouver, British Columbia, originally from Hong Kong, who won a World Series of Poker bracelet in the $1,500 No Limit Hold'em event at the 2007 World Series of Poker for $673,628. He tied the record for shortest heads-up match by defeating his opponent Richard Murnick in one hand. In fact he owns the record of beating the final three opponents in three consecutive hands.

As of 2023, his live tournament winnings exceed $1,600,000. His 91 cashes at the WSOP account for $1,277,459 of those winnings.

His consistent performance ranks him as the No. 1 (number of cashes) in the province of British Columbia, Canada.

Cheung won Event #38, a $1,500 No Limit Hold'em tournament at the 2007 World Series of Poker, defeating a field of 2,778 entrants and earning $673,628. At the final table he eliminated his last three opponents in three consecutive hands: John Kranyak (4th), Erica Schoenberg (3rd) and Richard Murnick, whom he beat in the single heads-up hand for the title (A♣K♦ against 8♦7♠), with Murnick taking $417,117 for second place.

In June 2025, Cheung finished 21st out of 10,794 entrants in the $1,000 Mini Main Event No Limit Hold'em at the 2025 World Series of Poker, winning $36,220.

As of October 2026, his recorded live tournament earnings total about $1.74 million from 156 cashes, with his most recent recorded cash in March 2026; he ranks 73rd on the Canadian all-time money list. WSOP.com credits him with one bracelet, three WSOP Circuit rings and total earnings of $1,374,101.

== World Series of Poker bracelets ==
Year	Tournament	Prize (US$)
2007	$1,500 No Limit Hold'em	$673,628
