= Dag Mikkelsen =

Norwegian poker player (born 1986)

Dag Martin Mikkelsen
- Nickname: dmmikkel
- Born: 25 June 1986 (age 40); Stavanger, Norway

World Series of Poker
- Bracelet: None
- Money finishes: 2
- Highest WSOP Main Event finish: 42nd, 2007

European Poker Tour
- Title: None
- Final table: 1
- Money finishes: 2

Dag Martin Mikkelsen (born 25 June 1986 in Stavanger) is a Norwegian professional poker player, known online as "dmmikkel". At the 2007 World Series of Poker Main Event Mikkelsen was at one time the chip leader but eventually finished the tournament in 42nd place, winning the largest sum a Norwegian had ever won in WSOP at that time. He is also known for getting a Royal Flush on camera during the 2007 WSOP Main Event, which has the probability of 1 in 124 000.

Mikkelsen started playing poker as a 17-year-old attending St. Olav High School. He continued playing poker recreationally while working as a truck driver in the Norwegian Army.

Mikkelsen finished fourth in the 2009 European Poker Tour Grand Final in Monte Carlo. He started the final day as the chip-leader and held it until the final 4, when he got eliminated.

Mikkelsen was sponsored by Full Tilt Poker in 2007.

== Career ==
List of meritorious achievement:

- 2nd Final in $1 million guarantee tournament online.
- Most Winning the world over 12 months (until November 2006) of $300 to $1000 Turbo SitnGo.
- 22nd place EPT Barcelona 2007.
- 4th place in the Paddy Power Irish Open, Dublin.
- 5th place in the Paddy Power Irish Open, Dublin (Omaha).
