= HOSE =

Form of mixed poker game

H.O.S.E. (or S.H.O.E.) is a term used for playing a mixed game of poker consisting of four different poker games.

- H stands for Hold 'em
- O for Omaha Eight or Better (i.e. Omaha hi-low (split-8 or better), or simply Omaha/8)
- S for 7-Card Stud
- E for 7 Card Stud Eight or Better

This form of poker is considered harder and not for beginners since it requires players to be skilled at many different forms of poker to succeed. It is also commonly played at casino tables. Players must have a great deal of concentration as well to not confuse which game is being played.

== Variations ==
There are two ways this game is played. The poker game can either change by round or by time.

If the game is changed by round, once the deck returns to the original dealer or a certain number of hands are played, the game changes to the next game in the sequence.

If the game is changed by time there will be a time limit set on each game. If there was a 10-minute time limit the game would change to the next in the sequence once the hand being played at the 10-minute mark is finished.

HOSE games are generally played fixed-limit.

== See also ==
- HORSE is a similar variant containing Razz.
