= Gary Styczynski =

Polish-American poker player

- Nickname: Gmoney

World Series of Poker
- Bracelet: 1
- Money finish: 1
- Highest WSOP Main Event finish: none

World Poker Tour
- Title: None
- Final tables: 2
- Money finishes: 3

Gary Styczynski is a professional poker player of Polish American descent.

He won a World Series of Poker bracelet in the $1,500 Limit Poker Hold'em event in 2007.

As of 2007, Gary Styczynki has tournament winnings in excess of $309,844.

== World Series of Poker bracelets ==
| Year | Tournament | Prize (US$) |
|---|---|---|
| 2007 | $1500 Limit Hold'em | $280,715 |
