= Joe Pelton =

American poker player and business analyst

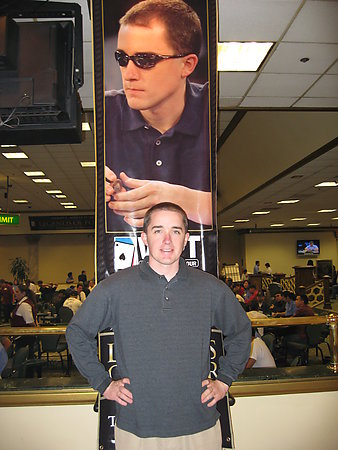
- Pelton at Bicycle Casino in Los Angeles, 2007
- Nickname: Moral Pillar
- Born: July 20, 1977 (age 49); Waterloo, Iowa, U.S.

World Series of Poker
- Bracelet: None
- Money finishes: 6
- Highest WSOP Main Event finish: None

World Poker Tour
- Title: 1
- Final tables: 2
- Money finishes: 4

European Poker Tour
- Title: None
- Final table: None
- Money finish: 1

Joe Pelton (born July 20, 1977, in Waterloo, Iowa) is an American business analyst and poker tournament player, who is based in Newport Beach, California. He attended Harvey Mudd College and graduated in 1999. While studying at Harvey Mudd, his nickname was the "Moral Pillar".

Pelton is active in financial markets and frequently writes about his trades.

== Poker ==
As of 2020, his total live tournament winnings exceeded $2,323,000.

=== World Poker Tour ===
Pelton is the winner of the 2006 WPT Legends of Poker Main Event, beating out notable professional players such as Hoyt Corkins and Scotty Nguyen. Later that same year, he placed third at the WPT Festa Al Lago Main Event. Before his win at the Legends of Poker (and the $1,500,000 first place prize), Pelton's largest tournament prize was $11,135.
