= Bill Edler =

American poker player (born 1964)

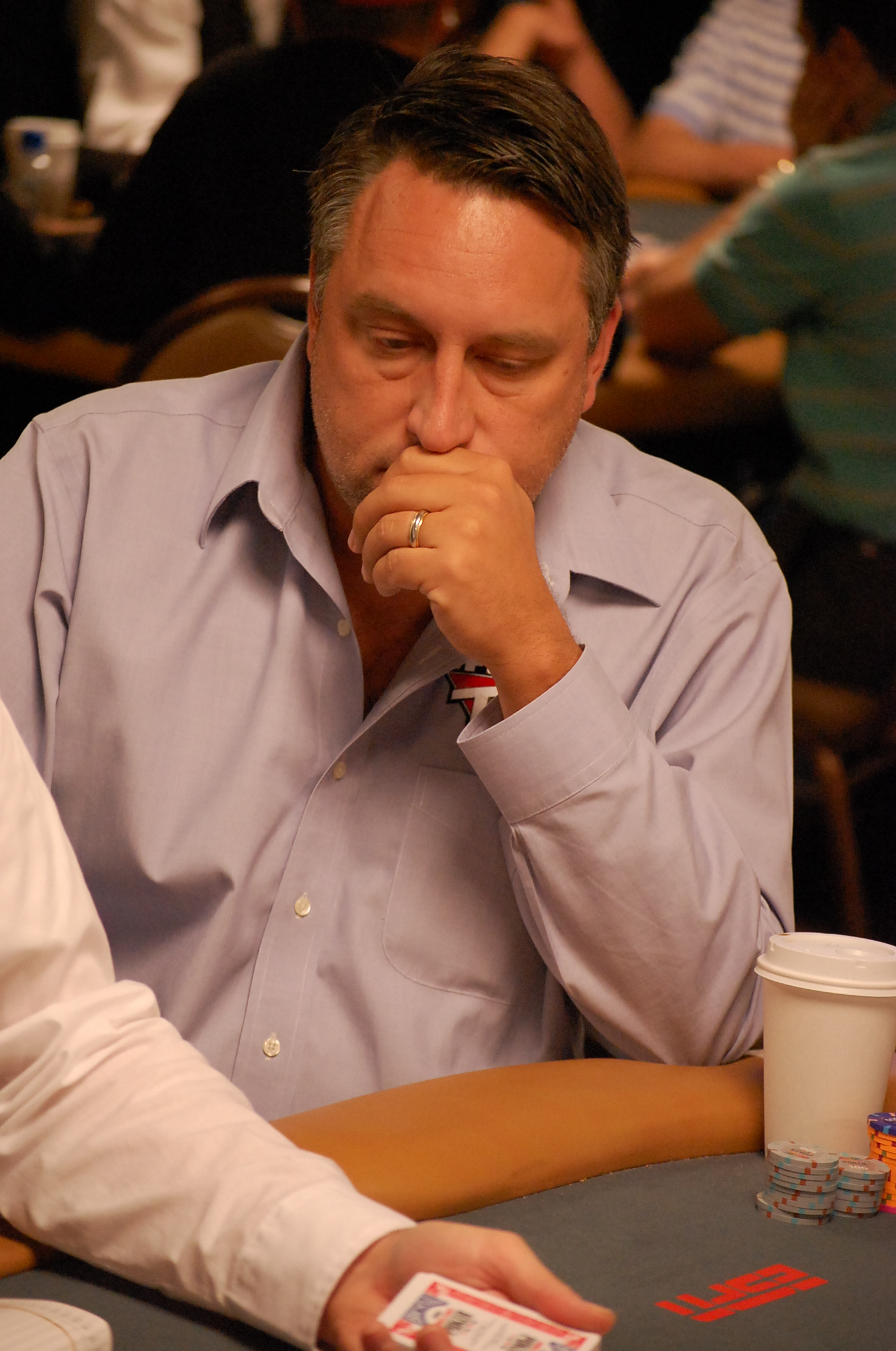
- Edler at the 2008 World Series of Poker
- Nickname: The Stunning One
- Born: February 11, 1964 (age 62); Evanston, Illinois, U.S.

World Series of Poker
- Bracelet: 1
- Money finishes: 7
- Highest WSOP Main Event finish: 23rd, 2007

World Poker Tour
- Title: 1
- Final tables: 2
- Money finishes: 8

William Edler (born February 11, 1964) is an American professional poker player from Las Vegas, Nevada. He has a J.D. degree from the University of California, Berkeley.

Edler won a World Series of Poker bracelet in 2007 by claiming the $5,000 buy-in shorthanded No-Limit hold'em tournament. The win earned Edler over $900,000.

In 2007, Edler cashed in the money for the first time in the $10,000 No Limit Hold'em Main Event Championship coming in 23rd place out of a field of 6,358 players, winning $333,490.

Edler has also had success in heads-up playing, winning the inaugural $10,000 buy-in Heads-Up Poker Championship in Compton, California in 2007.

In addition, Edler won the September 2007 World Poker Tour title at the Gulf Coast Poker Championship, winning $747,615. At this event he set the record for the greatest come back in World Poker Tour history. With only 17 players left out of 256 entries with only 2 tables left, Edler had only 2 x $1,000 chips left and was unable to meet the blinds of $4,000/$8,000. Edler went on to win the event, making this the biggest comeback in World Poker Tour tournament history.

Edler also finished 6th at the March 2007 Bay 101 Shooting Star WPT tournament, winning $160,000, and has cashed in six other WPT events.

As of 2010, Edler's total live tournament winnings exceed $3,425,000. His 6 cashes at the WSOP account for $1,306,489 of those winnings.
