= Will Durkee =

American poker player

William Durkee
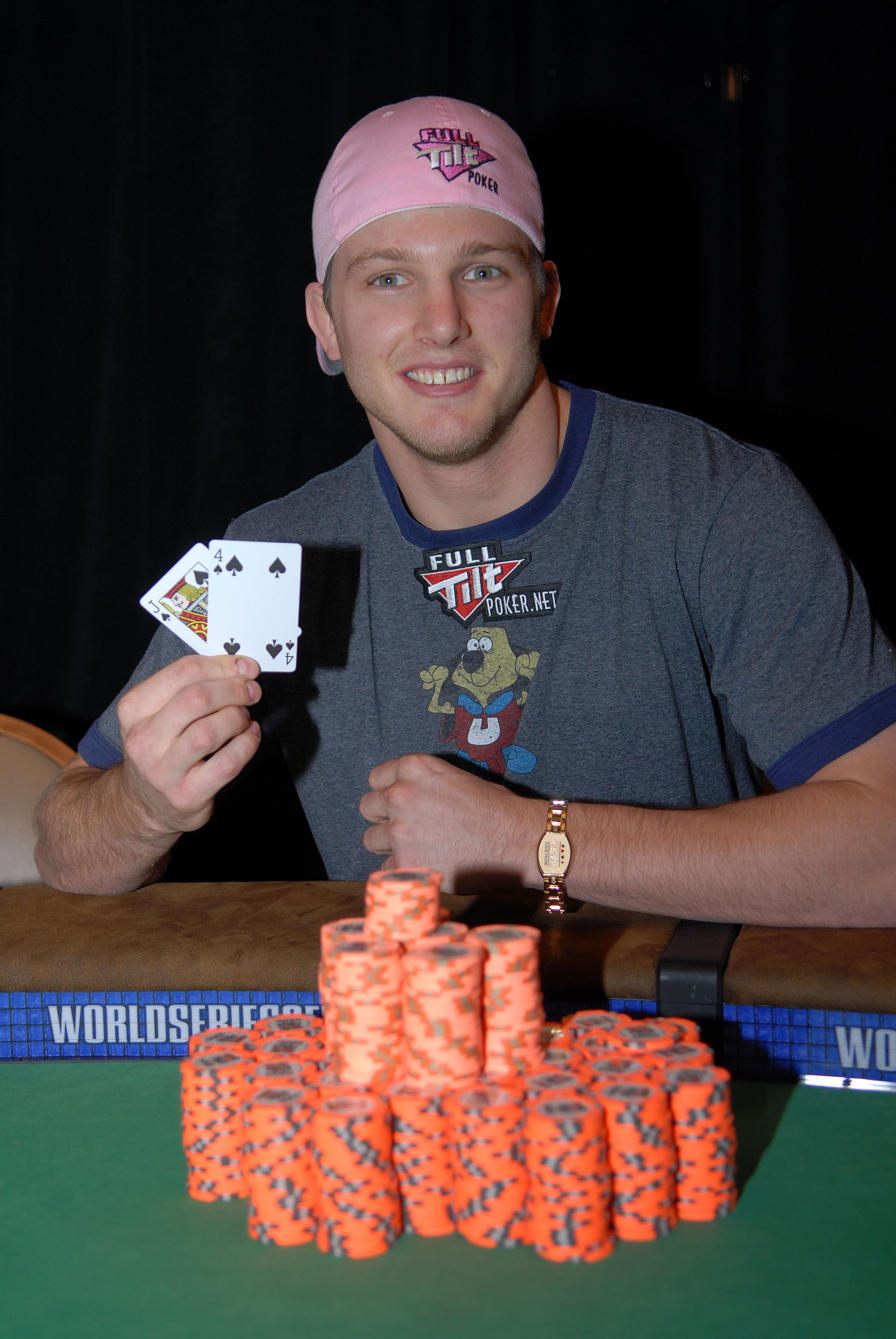
- Durkee, after winning the $2,000 No Limit Hold'em event at the 2007 World Series of Poker
- Born: c. 1983 (age 42–43)

World Series of Poker
- Bracelet: 1
- Money finishes: 7
- Highest WSOP Main Event finish: None

World Poker Tour
- Title: None
- Final table: None
- Money finish: 1

William Porter Durkee (born c. 1983) is a professional poker player. He was a graduate student at the Northwestern University in Chicago, Illinois. He graduated from the University of Virginia in 2005 with a B.A. in economics. He graduated with "Honorable Mention All-American" honors in wrestling and "Academic All-American."

In 2007, Durkee won a World Series of Poker bracelet in the $2,000 No-Limit Hold'em event for $566,916. Later that year, Durkee finished 13th in the World Series of Poker Europe Main Event, earning £38,010 ($76,542).

As of 2008, Durkee has earned over $750,000 in live tournament play. His seven cashes at the WSOP account for $715,422 of those winnings.

== World Series of Poker bracelets ==
Year	Tournament	Prize (US$)
2007	$2,000 No-Limit Hold'em	$566,916
