= HORSE (poker) =

Multi-game form of poker

H.O.R.S.E. is a multi-game form of poker commonly played at the high-stakes tables of casinos and in tournaments. It is most often played in a limit format, but can be played with other betting structures. The format consists of rounds of play cycling among Texas hold 'em (the H), Omaha hi-low split-eight or better (the O), Razz (the R), seven-card stud (the S), and seven card stud hi-low split-eight or better (the E).

== Variations ==
H.O.S.E. drops razz from the array.

C.H.O.R.S.E. adds Chowaha or Crazy Pineapple. This results in an even split of community card games and stud games. C.H.O.R.S.E.L. adds lowball.

H.O.R.S.E.H.A.T. is another 8-Game Mix, which includes more games than most other mixed poker games. PokerStars started offering this game in 2008. It consists of limit 2-7 Triple Draw, limit Texas hold 'em, limit Omaha Hi-Lo, limit Razz, limit Seven-card Stud, limit Seven card Stud Hi-Lo, no limit Texas hold 'em and pot limit Omaha.

== World Series of Poker events ==
H.O.R.S.E. made its debut at the World Series of Poker in 2002 with a $2,000 buy-in. John Hennigan won the event, earning $117,320.

A record-setting $50,000 buy-in H.O.R.S.E. tournament made its debut at the 2006 World Series of Poker. Chip Reese won the event, earning $1,716,000 for first place. After Reese died at the end of 2007, the Chip Reese Memorial Trophy was created in his honor. The trophy is awarded to the winner of the $50,000 championship event since the 2008 World Series of Poker.

The $50,000 buy-in tournament returned for the 2007 WSOP, along with seven satellite events with a $2,250 buy-in whose winners earned seats into the $50,000 buy-in event. The $50,000 event, which awarded $2,276,832 to first place, was won by professional player Freddy Deeb. Separate H.O.R.S.E. events with $2,500 and $5,000 buy-ins were also on the 2007 WSOP program.

The 2008 $50,000 H.O.R.S.E event was won by Scotty Nguyen, who received $1,989,120 for his victory. This was also the first time that the Chip Reese Memorial Trophy had been awarded to the winner of the competition.

The 2009 $50,000 H.O.R.S.E. event was won by David Bach, for $1,276,802.

For 2010, the $50,000 H.O.R.S.E. World Championship event was replaced by The Poker Player's Championship, with an identical buy-in. The 2010 WSOP also featured a new $10,000 H.O.R.S.E. Championship, joining already-existing events with $1,500 and $3,000 buy-ins.
