= 2007 World Series of Poker results =

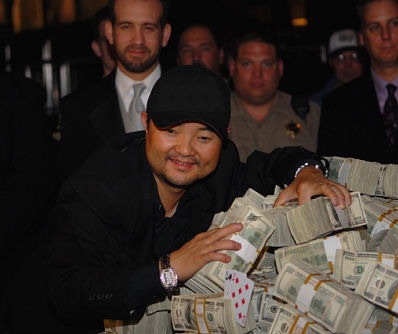
Jerry Yang after winning the 2007 World Series of Poker Main Event.

The 2007 World Series of Poker was the 38th annual World Series of Poker (WSOP). Held in Las Vegas, Nevada at the Rio All Suite Hotel and Casino, the series featured 55 poker championships in several variants. As a WSOP custom since 1976, each of the event winners receive a championship bracelet in addition to that event's prize money. The series culminates with the $10,000 No-Limit hold'em "Main Event", which has attracted thousands of entrants since 2004. The winner of the WSOP Main Event, who wins a multimillion-dollar prize, is considered to be the World Champion of Poker.

Most of the tournaments played at the WSOP are variants of Texas hold'em, a game where each player may use a combination of the five community cards and two hole cards to make the best hand. Another poker variant with community cards is Omaha, in which each player is dealt four hole cards and must use two of them in conjunction with three of the five community cards to make the best possible five-card hand. In contrast to games with community cards, some variants, such as stud or draw, deal each player separate hands with no common cards. Seven-card stud deals each player two hole cards, followed by four face-up cards one at a time, and then another hidden card, with betting after each round. Other games played at the 2007 tournament included Razz, H.O.R.S.E., and Deuce-to-Seven. Prior to 2000, seven-card stud was the most common game in U.S. casinos, but today hold'em has almost totally eclipsed the once popular game.

Within each of these poker variants, a myriad of options exist. For example, depending on the betting structure, a tournament might be described as no-limit, limit, or pot-limit. Games may include other variations on the rules governing the execution of the specific game such as shootout, eight or better, or heads up.

With 54,288 total entries and a combined prize pool of $159,796,918, the 2007 WSOP was the largest series of poker tournaments ever. For many, winning a share of the prize pool was all that mattered, while others sought the glory associated with winning a bracelet. This dichotomy could not have been illustrated better than a deal negotiated at the Senior Championship event. Tony Korfman wanted the money while Ernest Bennett wanted the glory. Rather than leave their fates to chance, the two of them ensured they got what they wanted. In exchange for splitting the prize money, Korfman agreed to let Bennett win the bracelet. After winning $8.25 million in the Main Event, Jerry Yang and his wife retired. "My winning today also means a lot to me, because I know that I can use this money to do a lot of good for other people out there," Yang said before donating over a million dollars to charity. Upon winning his record eleventh bracelet, Phil Hellmuth said, "the bracelets have always been a really huge deal, to me more than the other guys, because I knew that they represented history."

Age and disability was another story line of the 2007 WSOP. At 21 years and 10 days old, Steve Billirakis became the youngest person to ever win a WSOP bracelet. At the other end of the spectrum, 94-year-old Jack Ury was the oldest person to ever participate in the Main Event. Hal Lubarsky, a blind man, finished in 197th place at the Main Event.

== Key ==
| * | Elected to the Poker Hall of Fame |
| (#/#) | This denotes a bracelet winner. The first number is the number of bracelets won in 2007. The second number is the total number of bracelets won. Both numbers represent totals as of that point during the tournament. |
| Place | The place in which the player finished. |
| Name | The player who made it to the final table |
| Prize ($) | The amount of money, in U.S. Dollars ($), awarded for each finish at the event's final table |

== Results ==
=== Event 1: $5,000 World Championship Mixed hold'em Limit/No-Limit ===
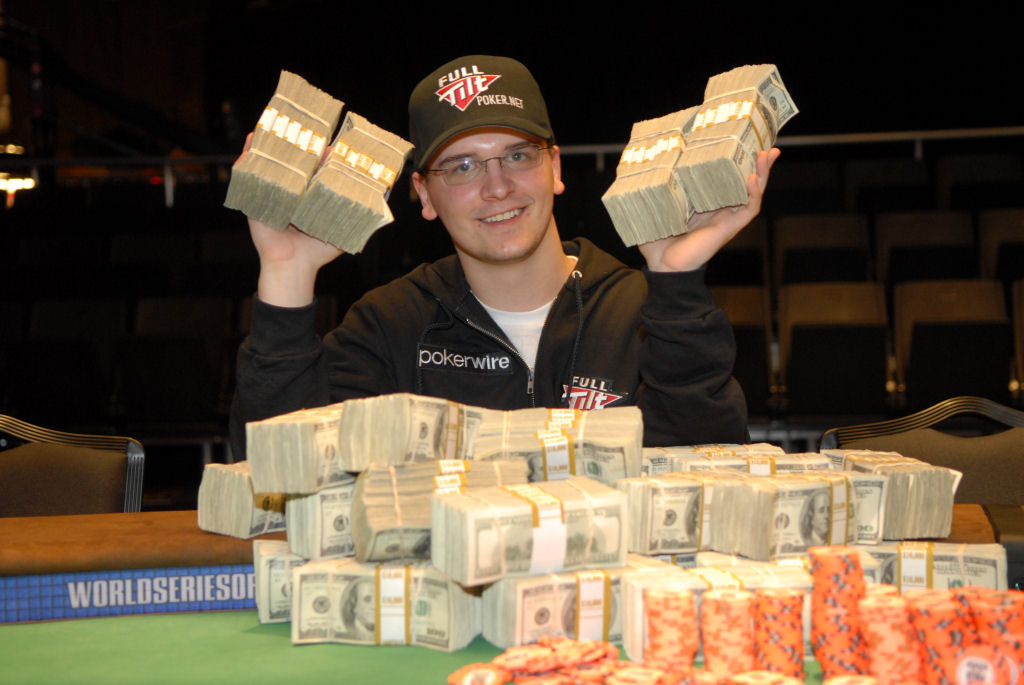
At the time of his victory, Steve Billirakis was the youngest person to have won a WSOP bracelet.

This event kicked off the 2007 WSOP. It was a $5,000 buy-in Mixed (alternating between limit and no-limit) Texas Hold'em tournament.

- 3-day event: Friday, June 1, 2007, to Sunday, June 3, 2007
- Number of entries: 451
- Total prize pool: $2,119,700
- Number of payouts: 45
- Winning hand: K♠ 2♦

Final table
| Place | Name | Prize |
|---|---|---|
| 1st | Steve Billirakis (1/1) | $536,287 |
| 2nd | Greg Mueller | $328,554 |
| 3rd | Tony George | $218,329 |
| 4th | Steve Paul-Ambrose | $146,259 |
| 5th | Fred Berger | $108,105 |
| 6th | Roger McDow | $84,788 |
| 7th | Kirk Morrison (0/1) | $63,591 |
| 8th | Jon Turner | $46,633 |
| 9th | John Younger | $33,915 |

=== Event 2: $500 Casino Employees No-Limit Hold'em ===
This was a $500 buy-in no-limit Texas Hold'em tournament reserved for casino employees that work in Nevada.

- 2-day event: Friday, June 1, 2007, to Saturday, June 2, 2007
- Number of buy-ins: 1,039
- Total prize pool: $467,500
- Number of payouts: 100
- Winning hand: 10♦ 4♠

Final table
| Place | Name | Prize |
|---|---|---|
| 1st | Frederick Narciso (1/1) | $104,701 |
| 2nd | Charles Fisher | $66,392 |
| 3rd | Gene Lang | $42,547 |
| 4th | Chris Chau | $28,053 |
| 5th | Kevin Kalthoff | $19,637 |
| 6th | David Dietrich | $14,962 |
| 7th | Meaghan Larivee | $11,221 |
| 8th | John Konich | $8,182 |
| 9th | Eric Schutzberg | $5,844 |

=== Event 3: $1,500 No-Limit Hold’em ===
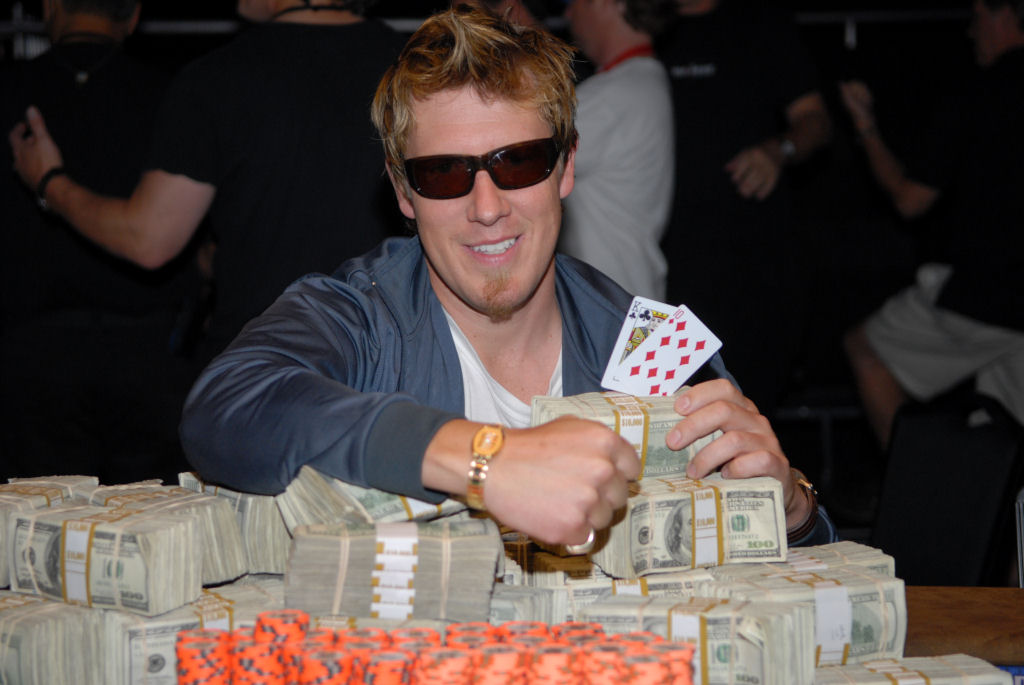
Ciarán O'Leary after winning the $1,500 No-Limit Texas Hold'em event at the 2007 World Series of Poker

- 3-day event: Saturday, June 2, 2007, to Monday, June 4, 2007
- Number of entries: 2,998
- Total Prizepool: $4,497,000
- Number of payouts: 270
- Winning hand: K♣ 10♦

Final table
| Place | Winner | Prize |
|---|---|---|
| 1st | Ciarán O'Leary (1/1) | $727,012 |
| 2nd | Paul Evans | $450,150 |
| 3rd | Alex Jacob | $282,367 |
| 4th | Jeffrey Yoak | $184,152 |
| 5th | Craig Crivello | $128,907 |
| 6th | Andreas Krause | $94,122 |
| 7th | Thad Smith | $73,661 |
| 8th | Bart Hanson | $55,246 |
| 9th | Matthew Vengrin | $43,378 |

Event 3 was the largest non-Main Event live tournament in history. This record, however, would be short lived as event 49 would break that record.

=== Event 4: $1,500 Pot-Limit Hold'em ===
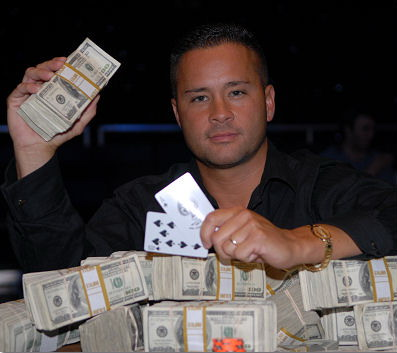
Spegal at the 2007 World Series of Poker

- 3-day event: Sunday, June 3, 2007, to Tuesday, June 5, 2007
- Number of buy-ins: 781
- Total prize pool: $1,066,065
- Number of payouts: 72
- Winning hand: A♠ 10♠

Final table
| Place | Name | Prize |
|---|---|---|
| 1st | Mike Spegal (1/1) | $252,290 |
| 2nd | Gavin Smith | $155,645 |
| 3rd | Jon Friedberg | $101,276 |
| 4th | William Hill | $67,162 |
| 5th | Tom Savitsky | $47,973 |
| 6th | Bruce Van Horn | $36,779 |
| 7th | Eric Lynch | $27,718 |
| 8th | Jeff Langdon | $20,255 |
| 9th | Marco Traniello | $14,925 |

=== Event 5: $2,500 Omaha/Seven-Card Stud Hi-Low-8 or Better ===
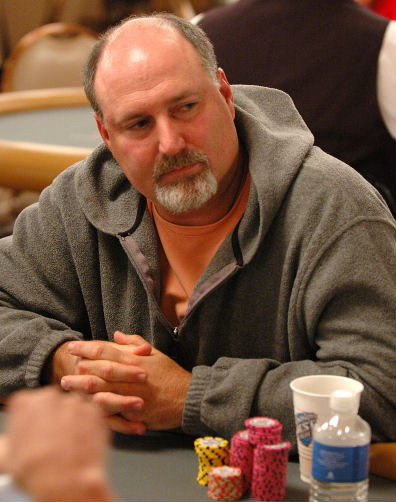
Schneider at the 2006 World Series of Poker $1,500 Limit Hold'em Shootout

- 3-day event: Sunday, June 3, 2007, to Tuesday, June 5, 2007
- Number of buy-ins: 327
- Total prize pool: $752,100
- Number of payouts: 32
- Winning hand: A♠ Q♥ 4♠ A♣ X A♦ 4♣See note

Final table
| Place | Name | Prize |
|---|---|---|
| 1st | Tom Schneider (1/1) | $214,347 |
| 2nd | Ed Tonnellier | $118,456 |
| 3rd | Annie Duke (0/1) | $75,210 |
| 4th | Chris Ferguson (0/5) | $50,391 |
| 5th | Chris Bell | $39,109 |
| 6th | David Benyamine | $29,708 |
| 7th | Joe Bolnick | $22,939 |
| 8th | John Phan | $16,922 |

- Note: While seven cards were dealt, only five cards are used to determine the Winning hand. The five cards used to determine the Winning hand were the three aces and two fours, one of the cards not used was not recorded.

=== Event 6: $1,500 Limit Hold'em ===
- 3-day event: Monday, June 4, 2007, to Wednesday, June 6, 2007
- Number of buy-ins: 910
- Total prize pool: $1,365,000
- Number of payouts: 90
- Winning hand: J♣ 8♦

Final table
| Place | Name | Prize |
|---|---|---|
| 1st | Gary Styczynski (1/1) | $280,715 |
| 2nd | Varouzhan Gumroyan | $177,627 |
| 3rd | Hansu Chu | $114,278 |
| 4th | Soheil Shamseddin | $75,771 |
| 5th | James Gorham | $53,412 |
| 6th | James Holland | $40,991 |
| 7th | Michael Banks | $30,433 |
| 8th | Peter O'Donnell | $22,359 |
| 9th | Anthony Imani | $16,148 |

=== Event 7: $5,000 Pot-Limit Omaha with rebuys ===
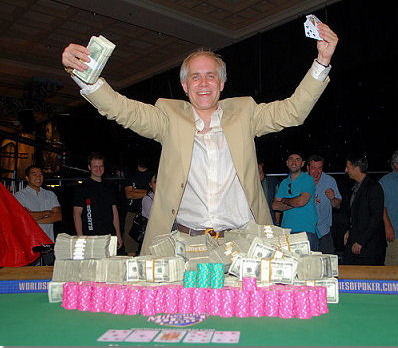
Boutin after winning the $5,000 Pot big black balls w/rb event

- 3-day event: Monday, June 4, 2007, to Wednesday, June 7, 2007
- Number of buy-ins: 145
- Number of rebuys: 450
- Total prize pool: $2,891,000
- Number of payouts: 18
- Winning hand: A♦ Q♠ 8♠ 7♣

Final table
| Place | Name | Prize |
|---|---|---|
| 1st | Burt Boutin (1/2) | $868,745 |
| 2nd | Erik Cajelais | $508,816 |
| 3rd | Dave Ulliott (0/1) | $349,811 |
| 4th | Sirous Jamshidi | $242,844 |
| 5th | Minh Ly | $183,579 |
| 6th | Larry Jonsson | $141,659 |
| 7th | John Juanda (0/3) | $112,749 |
| 8th | Humberto Brenes (0/2) | $83,839 |
| 9th | Robin Keston | $60,711 |

=== Event 8: $1,000 No-Limit Hold'em with rebuys ===
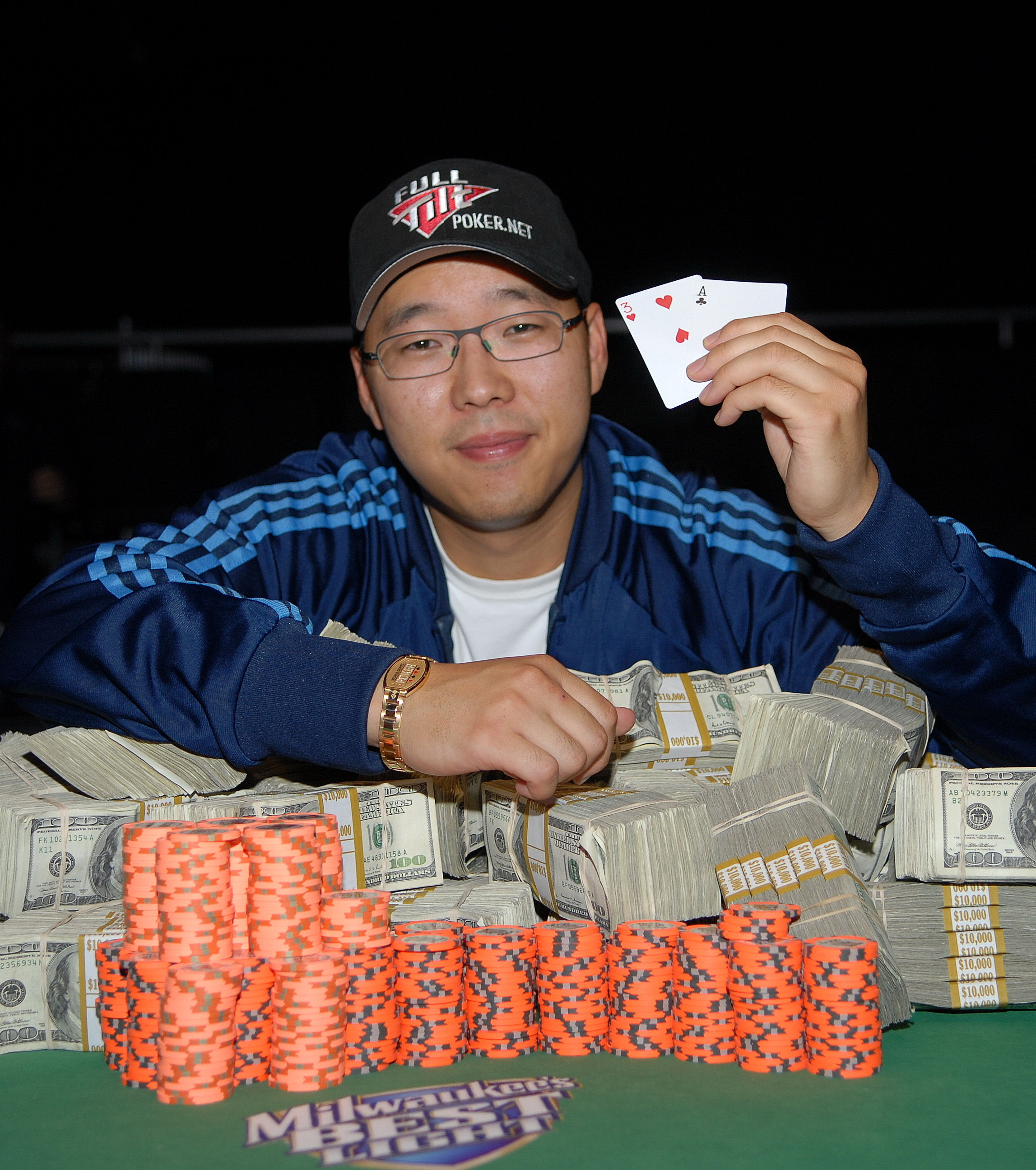
Chu, After winning the $1,000 no-limit Hold'em with rebuys event

- 3-day event: Tuesday, June 5, 2007, to Thursday, June 7, 2007
- Number of buy-ins: 814
- Number of rebuys: 1,814
- Total prize pool: $2,533,062
- Number of payouts: 81
- Winning hand: A♣ 3♥

Final table
| Place | Name | Prize |
|---|---|---|
| 1st | Michael Chu (1/1) | $585,774 |
| 2nd | Tommy Vu | $364,761 |
| 3rd | Barry Cales | $235,575 |
| 4th | Dolph Arnold | $157,050 |
| 5th | Shane Schleger | $111,455 |
| 6th | Michael Gracz (0/1) | $84,858 |
| 7th | Amir Vahedi (0/1) | $63,327 |
| 8th | Robert Aron | $46,862 |
| 9th | Jan Von Halle | $34,196 |

=== Event 9: $1,500 Omaha Hi-Low Split-8 or Better ===
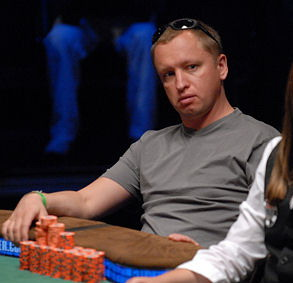
Kravchenko at the 2007 WSOP

- 3-day event: Tuesday, June 5, 2007, to Thursday, June 7, 2007
- Number of buy-ins: 690
- Total prize pool: $941,850
- Number of payouts: 63
- Winning hand: A♦ 10♠ 9♦ 4♥

Final table
| Place | Name | Prize |
|---|---|---|
| 1st | Alex Kravchenko (1/1) | $228,446 |
| 2nd | Bryan Devonshire | $140,336 |
| 3rd | John Varner | $92,301 |
| 4th | J.R. Reiss | $60,749 |
| 5th | Bryan Andrews | $43,796 |
| 6th | Yueqi "Rich" Zhu | $33,907 |
| 7th | Jordan Morgan | $25,430 |
| 8th | Jeffrey Calkins | $18,837 |
| 9th | Richard Ashby | $13,657 |

Ninth-place finisher Richard Ashby was eliminated simultaneously along with Ron Ware (10th place) on the final hand of day, 2 by Jordan Morgan. Therefore, he never appeared at the official final table.

=== Event 10: $2,000 No-Limit Hold'em ===
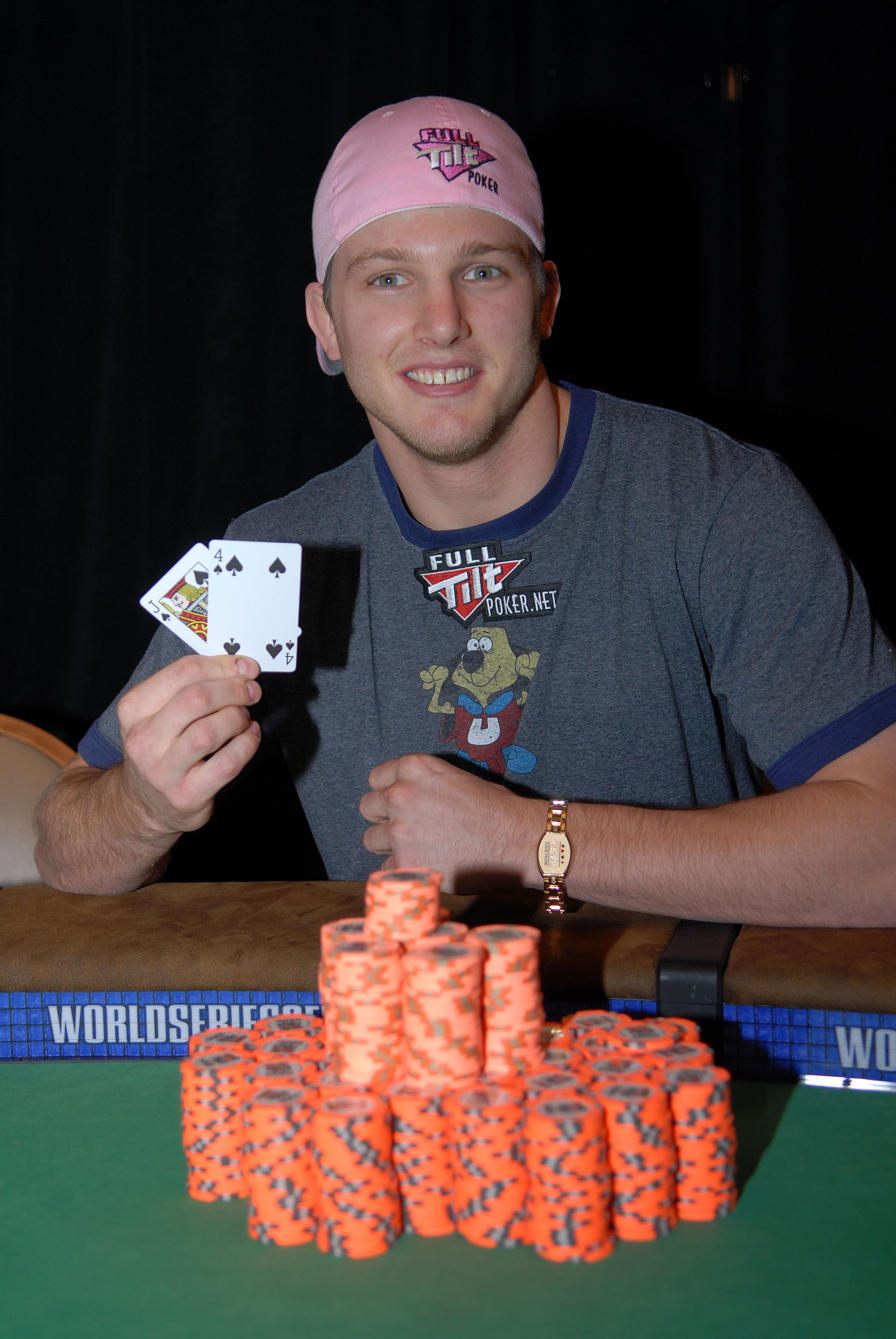
Durkee after winning the $2,000 no-limit Hold'em event

- 3-day event: Wednesday, June 6, 2007, to Friday, June 8, 2007
- Number of buy-ins: 1,531
- Total prize pool: $2,786,420
- Number of payouts: 153
- Winning hand: J♠ 4♠

Final table
| Place | Name | Prize |
|---|---|---|
| 1st | Will Durkee (1/1) | $566,916 |
| 2nd | Todd Terry | $353,875 |
| 3rd | Hunter Frey | $231,273 |
| 4th | Justin Bonomo | $156,040 |
| 5th | Michael Banducci | $105,884 |
| 6th | Stanley Weiss | $78,020 |
| 7th | Walter Browne | $58,515 |
| 8th | Gil George | $43,190 |
| 9th | Ronnie Hofman | $32,880 |

=== Event 11: $5,000 World Championship Seven-Card Stud ===
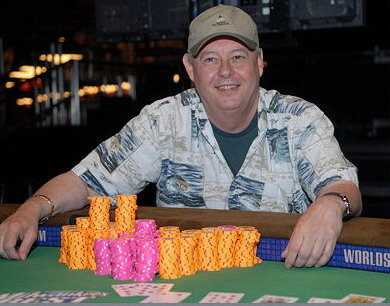
Reslock at the 2007 WSOP

- 3-day event: Wednesday, June 6, 2007, to Friday, June 8, 2007
- Number of buy-ins: 180
- Total prize pool: $846,000
- Number of payouts: 24
- Winning hand: 10♣ 10♠ 4♦ 10♦ K♦ 2♠ J♥

Final table
| Place | Name | Prize |
|---|---|---|
| 1st | Chris Reslock (1/1) | $258,453 |
| 2nd | Phil Ivey (0/5) | $143,820 |
| 3rd | David Oppenheim | $93,060 |
| 4th | Pat Pezzin | $61,335 |
| 5th | Theo Jørgensen | $46,350 |
| 6th | Ted Lawson (0/1) | $35,532 |
| 7th | Oriane Teysseire | $27,072 |
| 8th | Marco Traniello | $19,458 |

=== Event 12: $1,500 No-Limit Hold'em (6-handed) ===
This event was played in a shorthanded format, no more than six players per table, with no more than six players occupying a table at any time during the tournament.

- 3-day event: Thursday, June 7, 2007, to Saturday, June 9, 2007
- Number of buy-ins: 1,427
- Total prize pool: $1,947,855
- Number of payouts: 120
- Winning hand: A♦ 6♦

Final table
| Place | Name | Prize |
|---|---|---|
| 1st | Jason Warner (1/1) | $481,698 |
| 2nd | David Zeitlin | $269,778 |
| 3rd | Steve Olek | $186,020 |
| 4th | David Mitchell-Lolis | $123,689 |
| 5th | Matt Brady | $92,523 |
| 6th | Brian Miller | $61,357 |

=== Event 13: $5,000 World Championship Pot-Limit Hold'em ===
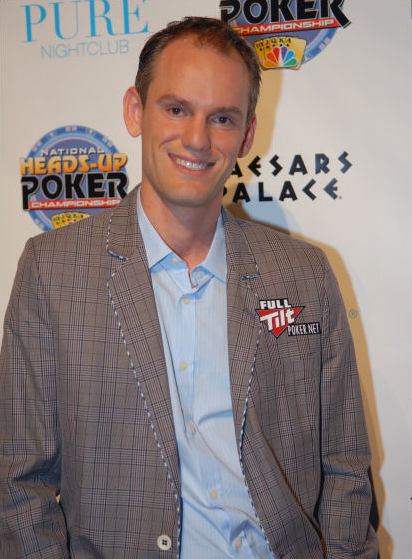
Cunningham at the 2008 NBC National Heads-Up Poker Championship

- 3-day event: Friday, June 8, 2007, to Sunday, June 10, 2007
- Number of buy-ins: 398
- Total prize pool: $1,870,600
- Number of payouts: 36
- Winning hand: K♣ 9♦

Final table
| Place | Name | Prize |
|---|---|---|
| 1st | Allen Cunningham (1/5) | $487,287 |
| 2nd | Jeffrey Lisandro | $294,260 |
| 3rd | Humberto Brenes (0/2) | $197,348 |
| 4th | Jason Lester (0/1) | $132,813 |
| 5th | Joe Patrick | $99,142 |
| 6th | Travis Rice | $78,565 |
| 7th | Gavin Griffin (0/1) | $58,924 |
| 8th | Keith Lehr (0/1) | $43,959 |
| 9th | Alan Jaffray | $31,800 |

=== Event 14: $1,500 Seven-Card Stud ===
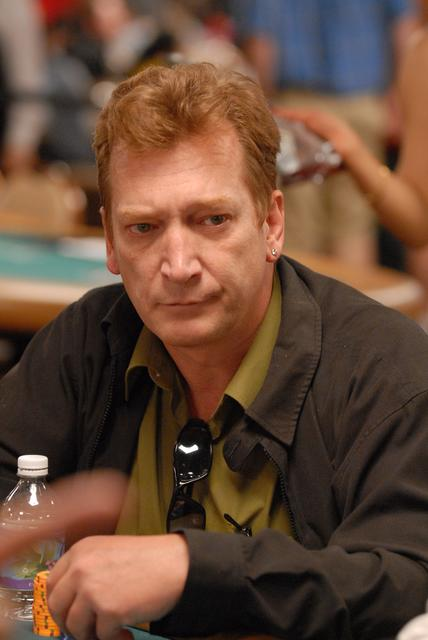
Keiner after winning the $1,500 Seven Card Stud event

- 2-day event: Friday, June 8, 2007, to Saturday, June 9, 2007
- Number of buy-ins: 395
- Total prize pool: $539,175
- Number of payouts: 40
- Winning hand: K♠ K♣ 2♥ 4♠ 3♥ 2♠ Q♦

Final table
| Place | Name | Prize |
|---|---|---|
| 1st | Michael Keiner (1/1) | $146,987 |
| 2nd | Nesbitt Coburn | $80,876 |
| 3rd | Steve Sung | $51,222 |
| 4th | Barry Greenstein (0/2) | $33,698 |
| 5th | Dale Phillips | $26,150 |
| 6th | Greg Raymer (0/1) | $19,680 |
| 7th | John Robertson | $15,097 |
| 8th | Larry Eubanks | $11,053 |

=== Event 15: $1,500 No-Limit Hold'em ===
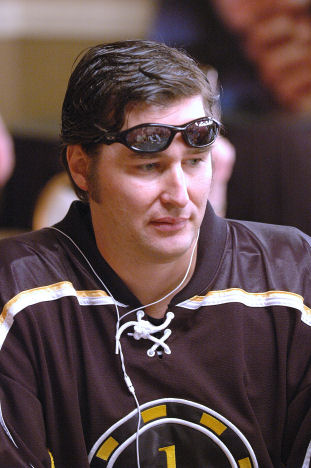
Hellmuth at the 2006 World Series of Poker

- 3-day event: Saturday, June 9, 2007, to Monday, June 11, 2007
- Number of buy-ins: 2,628
- Total prize pool: $3,587,220
- Number of payouts: 270
- Winning hand: A♠ 3♥

Final table
| Place | Name | Prize |
|---|---|---|
| 1st | Phil Hellmuth* (1/11) | $637,254 |
| 2nd | Andy Philachack | $394,594 |
| 3rd | Rick Fuller | $247,518 |
| 4th | Morgan Machina | $161,425 |
| 5th | Scott Clements (0/1) | $112,997 |
| 6th | David Simon | $82,506 |
| 7th | Fabrice Soulier | $64,570 |
| 8th | Ut Nguyen | $48,427 |
| 9th | Taylor Douglas | $38,025 |

Phil Hellmuth won his eleventh WSOP bracelet, the most of any player. He was previously one of three players with ten bracelets the others being Johnny Chan and Doyle Brunson.

=== Event 16: $2,500 H.O.R.S.E. ===
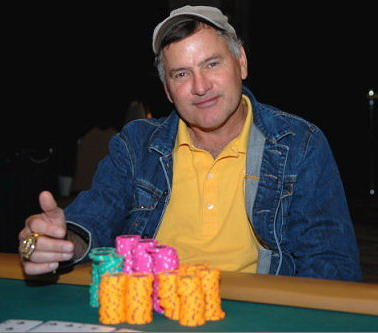
Richburg at the 2007 WSOP

- 3-day event: Saturday, June 9, 2007, to Monday, June 11, 2007
- Number of buy-ins: 382
- Total prize pool: $878,600
- Number of payouts: 40
- Winning hand: 6-4-3-2-A-(4–3) (Razz) (card suits do not matter in Razz)

Final table
| Place | Name | Prize |
|---|---|---|
| 1st | James Richburg (1/2) | $239,503 |
| 2nd | Walter Browne | $131,790 |
| 3rd | Chris Björin (0/2) | $83,467 |
| 4th | Tom Schneider (1/1) | $54,913 |
| 5th | Ali Eslami | $42,612 |
| 6th | Robert Mizrachi | $32,069 |
| 7th | Herb Van Dyke | $24,601 |
| 8th | Harry Kazazian | $18,011 |

Razz is a form of stud poker that is normally played for ace-to-five low (lowball poker). The object of Razz is to make the lowest five-card possible hand from the seven cards you are dealt. In Razz, straights and flushes do not count against you for low, and the ace always plays low. The best possible Razz hand is 5-4-3-2-A, or 5 high, also known as "the wheel" or "the bicycle". Deuce-to-seven Razz is also sometimes played.

=== Event 17: $1,000 World Championship Ladies No-Limit Hold'em ===
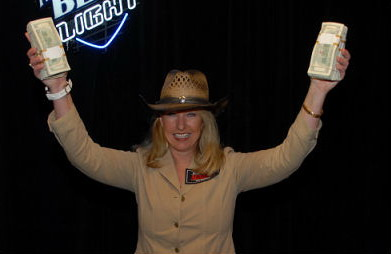
Boyer after winning the Ladies World Championship event

- 3-day event: Sunday, June 10, 2007, to Tuesday, June 12, 2007
- Number of buy-ins: 1,286
- Total prize pool: $1,755,000
- Number of payouts: 99
- Winning hand: K♠ 10♠

Final table
| Place | Name | Prize |
|---|---|---|
| 1st | Sally Boyer (1/1) | $262,077 |
| 2nd | Anne Heft | $166,177 |
| 3rd | Randi Calabro | $106,494 |
| 4th | Kathleen Gliva | $70,216 |
| 5th | Katja Thater | $49,151 |
| 6th | Frauke Sporschill | $37,448 |
| 7th | Mindy Trinidad | $28,086 |
| 8th | Vanessa Selbst | $20,480 |
| 9th | Julie Dang | $14,628 |

The 1,286 entrants made this the largest ladies only tournament ever.

=== Event 18: $5,000 World Championship Limit Hold'em ===
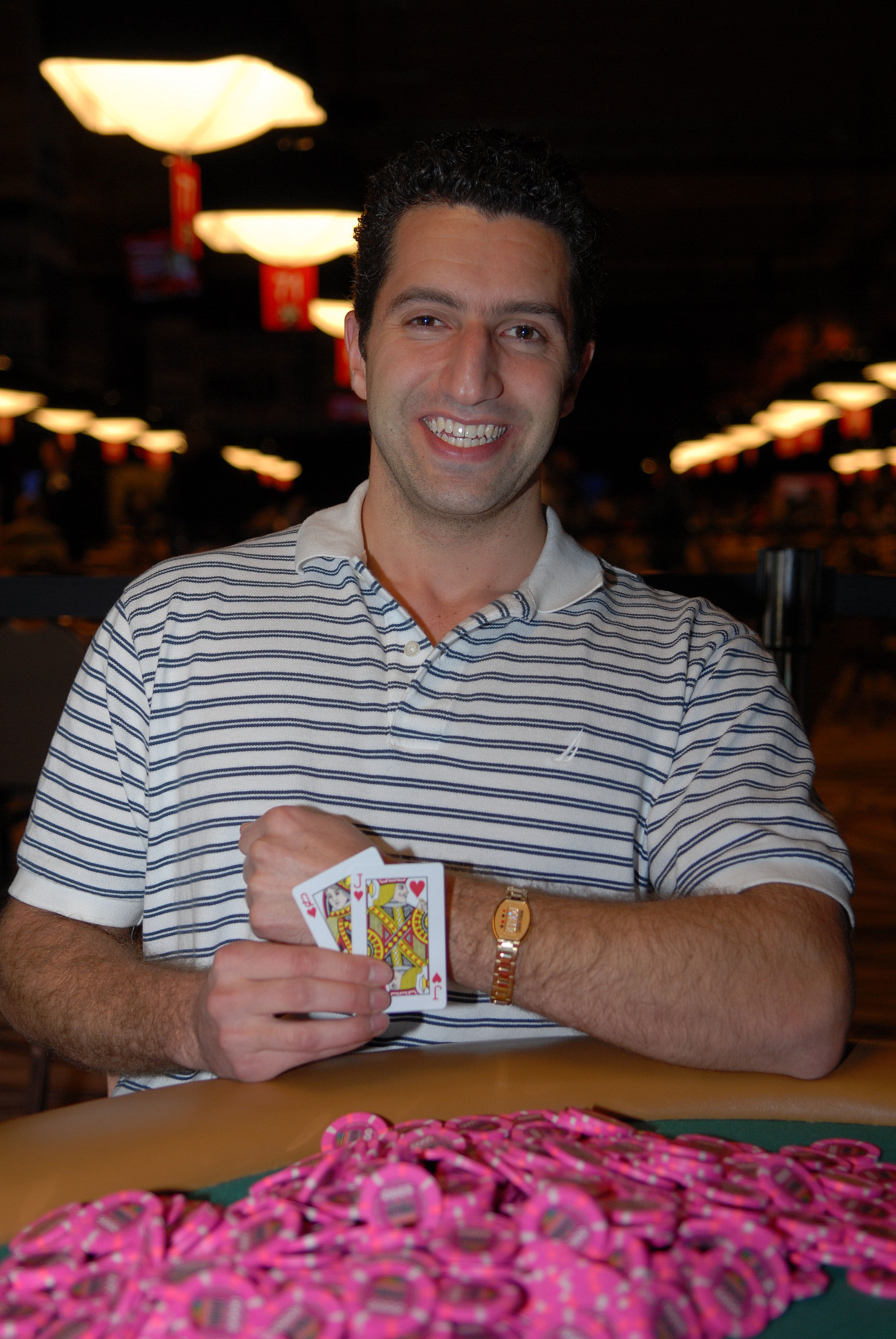
Getzoyan at the 2007 WSOP

- 3-day event: Sunday, June 10, 2007, to Tuesday, June 12, 2007
- Number of buy-ins: 257
- Total prize pool: $1,207,900
- Number of payouts: 27
- Winning hand: Q♥ J♥

Final table
| Place | Name | Prize |
|---|---|---|
| 1st | Saro Getzoyan (1/1) | $333,379 |
| 2nd | Geoff Sanford | $200,511 |
| 3rd | William Thorson | $136,493 |
| 4th | Thor Hansen (0/2) | $93,008 |
| 5th | David Gee | $68,850 |
| 6th | Tom Koral | $54,356 |
| 7th | Ray Dehkharghani | $41,069 |
| 8th | Don Todd | $30,198 |
| 9th | Gabriel Nassif | $21,742 |

Like David Williams, Gabriel Nassif was first known for competing Magic: The Gathering Pro Tour.

=== Event 19: $2,500 No-Limit Hold'em ===
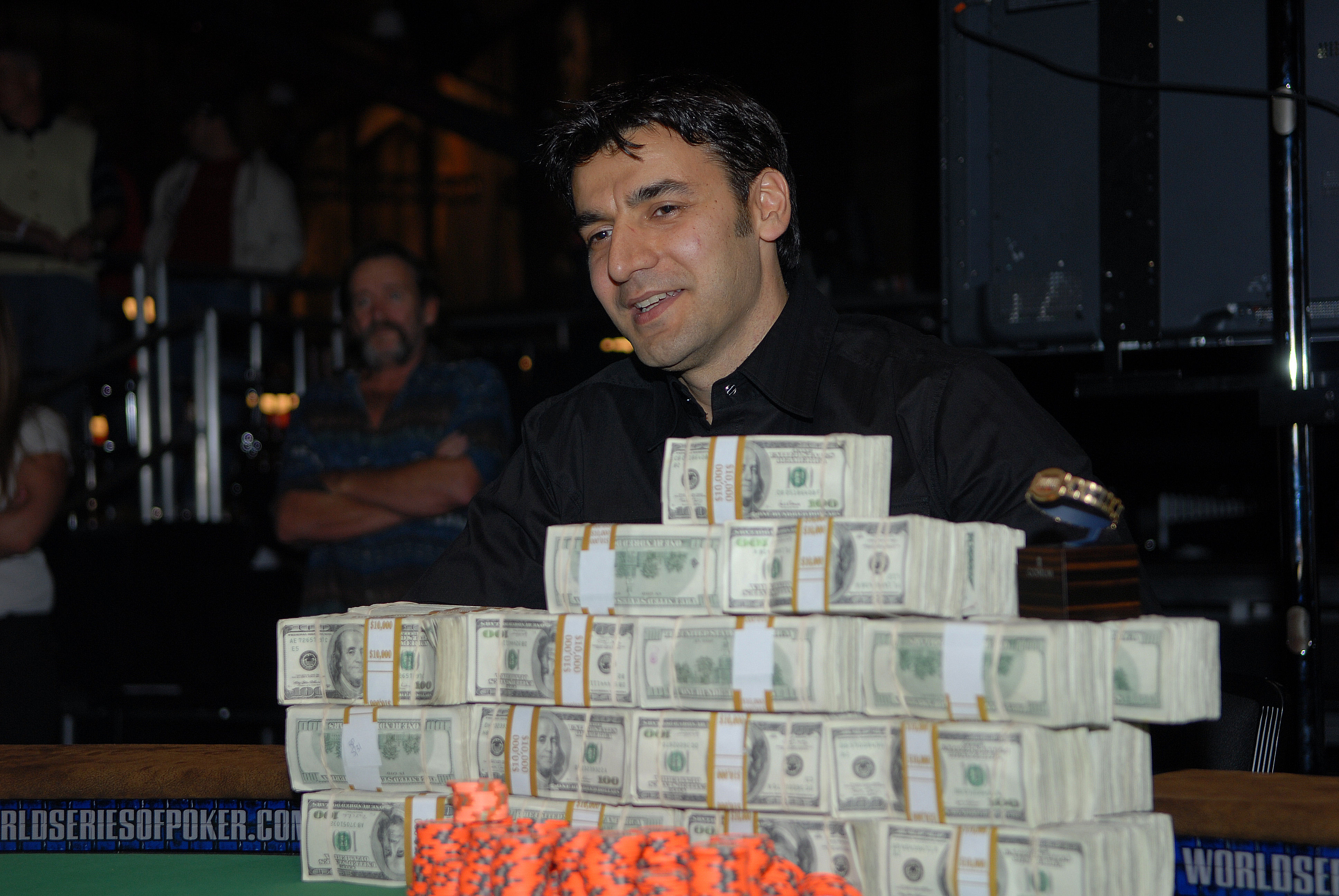
Safieddine at the 2007 WSOP

- 3-day event: Monday, June 11, 2007, to Wednesday, June 13, 2007
- Number of buy-ins: 1,013
- Total prize pool: $2,329,900
- Number of payouts: 99
- Winning hand: 4♥ 4♦

Final table
| Place | Name | Prize |
|---|---|---|
| 1st | Francois Safieddine (1/1) | $521,785 |
| 2nd | John Phan | $330,846 |
| 3rd | Marcus Obser | $212,021 |
| 4th | Devin Porter | $139,794 |
| 5th | Shawn Hattem | $97,856 |
| 6th | Lars Bonding | $74,557 |
| 7th | Humberto Brenes (0/2) | $55,918 |
| 8th | Alex Bolotin | $40,773 |
| 9th | Bertrand Grospellier | $29,124 |

=== Event 20: $2,000 Seven-Card Stud Hi-Low Split-8 or Better ===
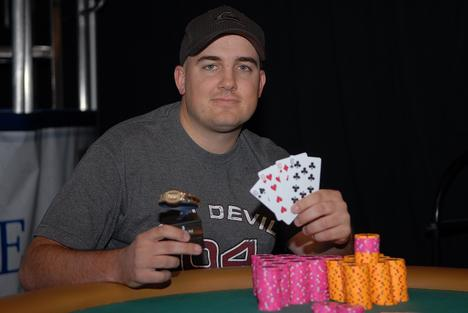
Hughes won a second bracelet in 2008.

- 3-day event: Monday, June 11, 2007, to Wednesday, June 13, 2007
- Number of buy-ins: 340
- Total prize pool: $618,000
- Number of payouts: 32
- Winning hand: J♥ 5♥ 10♥ 10♦ 10♣ 6♠ 10♠

Final table
| Place | Name | Prize |
|---|---|---|
| 1st | Ryan Hughes (1/1) | $176,358 |
| 2nd | Min Lee | $97,461 |
| 3rd | Douglas Carli | $61,880 |
| 4th | Greg Raymer (0/1) | $41,460 |
| 5th | Steve Graboski | $32,178 |
| 6th | Jim Weir | $24,443 |
| 7th | Ron Ware | $18,873 |
| 8th | Adam Spiegelberg | $13,923 |

=== Event 21: $1,500 No-Limit Hold'em Shootout ===
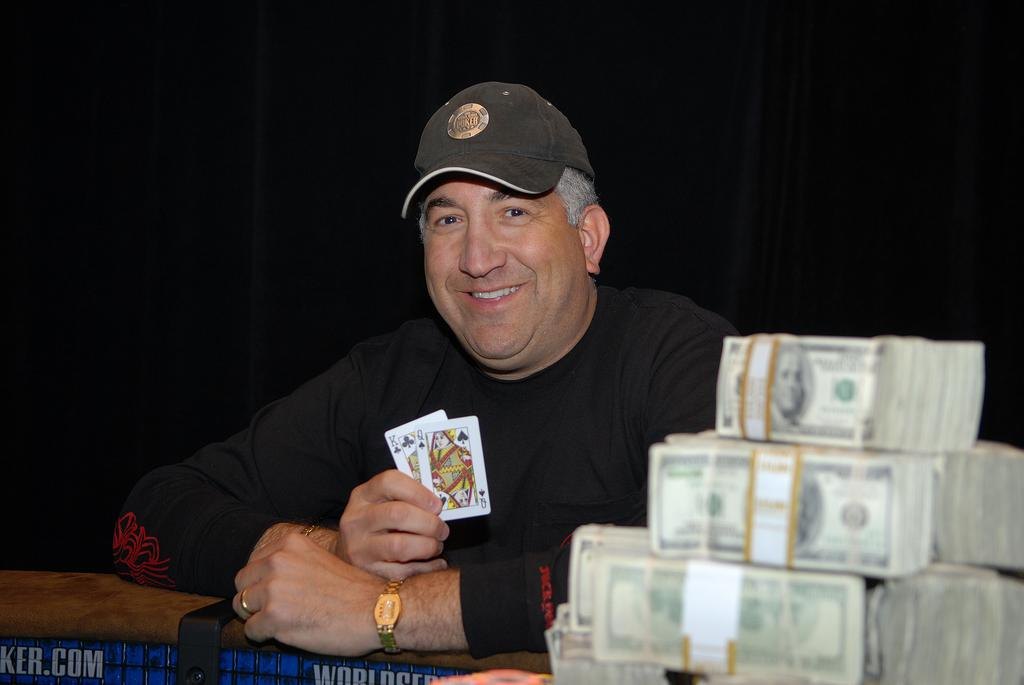
Baruch at the 2007 WSOP

- 2-day event: Tuesday, June 12, 2007, to Wednesday, June 13, 2007
- Number of buy-ins: 900
- Total prize pool: $1,228,500
- Number of payouts: 90
- Winning hand: K♣ Q♠

Final table
| Place | Name | Prize |
|---|---|---|
| 1st | Don Baruch (1/1) | $264,106 |
| 2nd | Jared Davis | $149,263 |
| 3rd | Daniel Negreanu (0/3) | $101,351 |
| 4th | Thomas Fuller | $68,796 |
| 5th | Michael Wehner | $36,855 |
| 6th | Brendan Lee | $22,113 |
| 7th | Doug Baughman | $15,971 |
| 8th | Erick Lindgren | $12,899 |
| 9th | Fred Goldberg | $9,828 |

=== Event 22: $5,000 No-Limit Hold'em ===
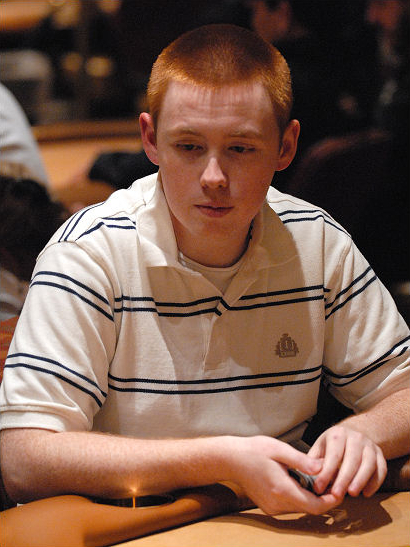
Mackey at the $15,000 buy-in National Poker League's Vegas Open Championship in 2007

- 3-day event: Wednesday, June 13, 2007, to Friday, June 15, 2007
- Number of buy-ins: 640
- Total prize pool: $3,012,700
- Number of payouts: 63
- Winning hand: 10♦ 2♥

Final table
| Place | Name | Prize |
|---|---|---|
| 1st | James Mackey (1/1) | $730,740 |
| 2nd | Stuart Fox | $448,892 |
| 3rd | Michael Binger | $295,245 |
| 4th | William McMahon | $194,319 |
| 5th | Karga Holt | $140,091 |
| 6th | Nick Schulman | $108,457 |
| 7th | Jan Sørensen (0/2) | $81,343 |
| 8th | Tex Barch | $60,254 |
| 9th | Michael Gracz | $43,684 |

=== Event 23: $1,500 Pot-Limit Omaha ===
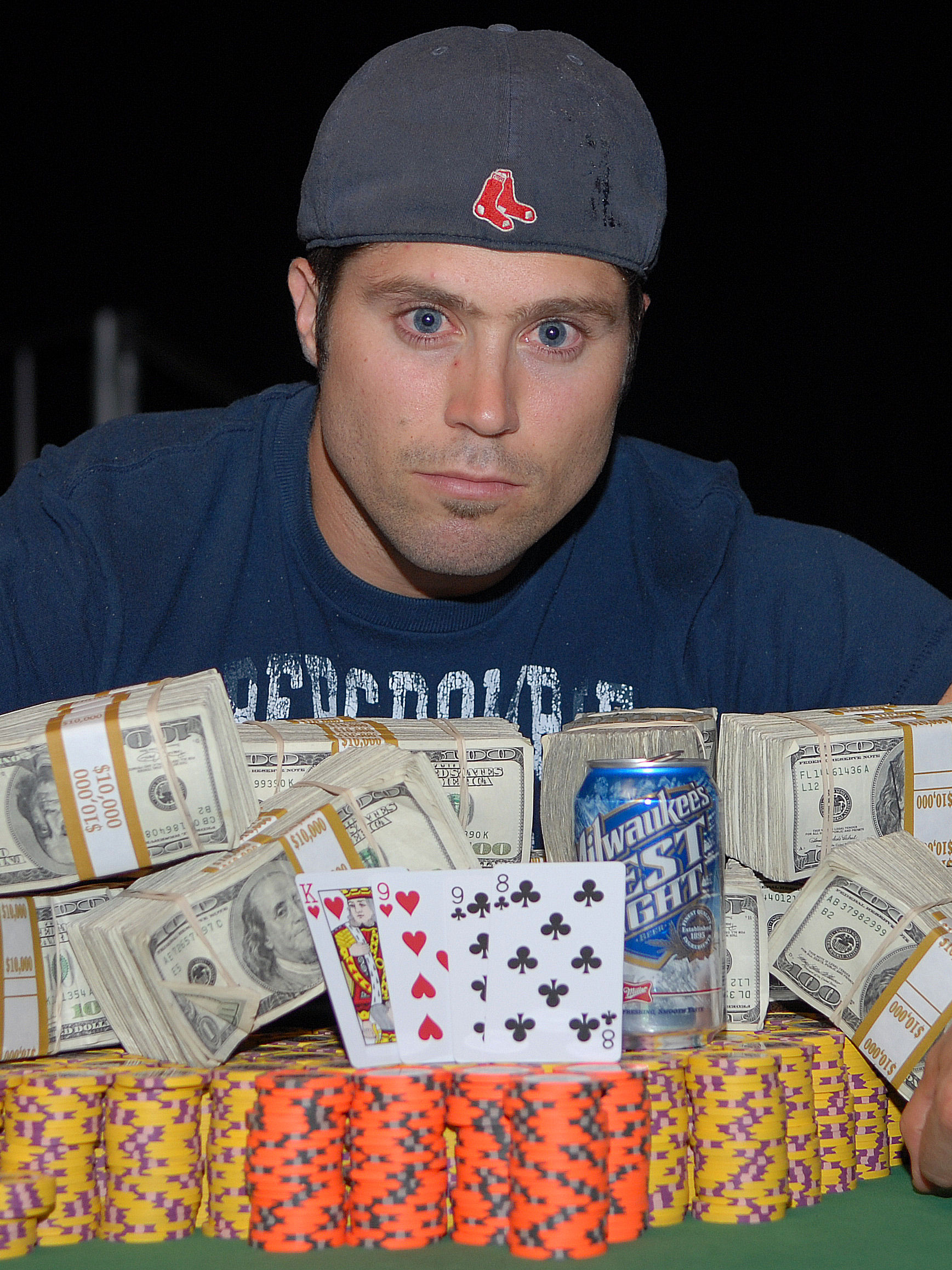
Clements at the 2007 WSOP

- 2-day event: Thursday, June 14, 2007, to Friday, June 15, 2007
- Number of buy-ins: 576
- Total prize pool: $786,240
- Number of payouts: 54
- Winning hand: K♥ 9♥ 9♣ 8♣

Final table
| Place | Name | Prize |
|---|---|---|
| 1st | Scott Clements (1/2) | $194,206 |
| 2nd | Eric Lynch | $119,508 |
| 3rd | Dau "Tommy" Ly | $78,624 |
| 4th | Will Durkee (1/1) | $52,285 |
| 5th | Jason Newburger | $38,133 |
| 6th | Mark Davis | $29,877 |
| 7th | Andrew Black | $22,408 |
| 8th | Anthony MacCanello | $16,511 |
| 9th | K.U. Davis | $11,794 |

=== Event 24: $3,000 World Championship Seven-Card Stud Hi/Lo Split 8 or Better ===
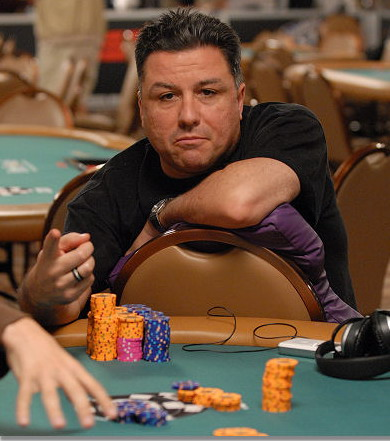
Elezra at the 2007 WSOP

- 3-day event: Thursday, June 14, 2007, to Saturday, June 16, 2007
- Number of buy-ins: 236
- Total prize pool: $651,360
- Number of payouts: 24
- Winning hand: K-Q-10-7-3-J-A

Final table
| Place | Name | Prize |
|---|---|---|
| 1st | Eli Elezra (1/1) | $198,984 |
| 2nd | Scotty Nguyen (0/4) | $110,731 |
| 3rd | Dutch Boyd (0/1) | $71,650 |
| 4th | John Harkness | $47,224 |
| 5th | David Sklansky (0/3) | $35,825 |
| 6th | Thor Hansen (0/2) | $27,357 |
| 7th | George Hardie | $20,844 |
| 8th | Marshall Ragir | $14,981 |

=== Event 25: $2,000 No-Limit Hold'em ===
Ponzio at the 2007 WSOP

- 3-day event: Friday, June 15, 2007, to Sunday, June 17, 2007
- Number of buy-ins: 1,619
- Total prize pool: $2,946,580
- Number of payouts: 153
- Winning hand: K♥ Q♥

Final table
| Place | Name | Prize |
|---|---|---|
| 1st | Ben Ponzio (1/1) | $599,467 |
| 2nd | David Hewitt | $374,216 |
| 3rd | Justin Rollo | $244,566 |
| 4th | Evan Schwartz | $165,008 |
| 5th | Travis Rice | $111,970 |
| 6th | Danny Noam | $82,504 |
| 7th | Adam Ross | $61,878 |
| 8th | Ken Einiger | $45,672 |
| 9th | Darryl Ronconi | $34,770 |

=== Event 26: $5,000 H.O.R.S.E. ===
Schwartz at the 2007 WSOP

- 3-day event: Friday, June 15, 2007, to Sunday, June 17, 2007
- Number of buy-ins: 192
- Total prize pool: $902,400
- Number of payouts: 24
- Winning hand: 8♥ 5♦ 3♠ 2♣ (Omaha Hi/Lo)

Final table
| Place | Name | Prize |
|---|---|---|
| 1st | Ralph Schwartz (1/1) | $275,683 |
| 2nd | Bill Gazes | $153,408 |
| 3rd | Yuebin Guo | $99,264 |
| 4th | Phil Ivey (0/5) | $65,424 |
| 5th | Robert Mizrachi | $49,632 |
| 6th | Alexander Jung | $37,901 |
| 7th | Thom Schultz | $28,877 |
| 8th | Jeff Campbell | $20,755 |

=== Event 27: $1,500 No-Limit Hold'em ===
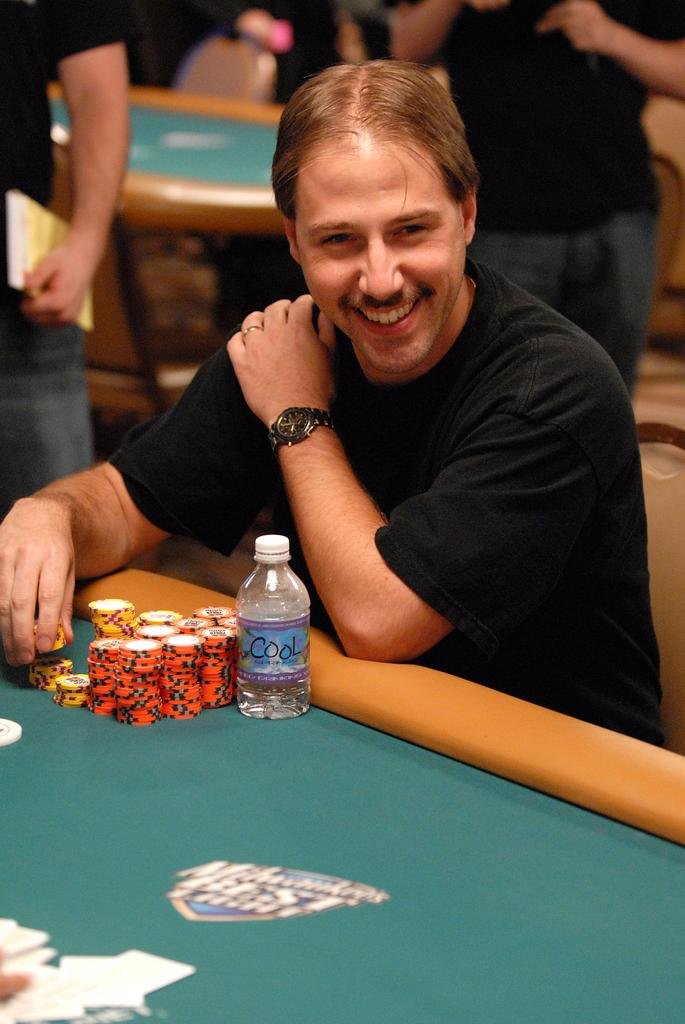
Stucke at the 2007 WSOP

- 3-day event: Saturday, June 16, 2007, to Monday, June 18, 2007
- Number of buy-ins: 2,315
- Total prize pool: $3,159,975
- Number of payouts: 198
- Winning hand: 7♦ 7♠

Final table
| Place | Name | Prize |
|---|---|---|
| 1st | David Stucke (1/1) | $603,069 |
| 2nd | Young Cho | $382,357 |
| 3rd | Seth Weinger | $246,478 |
| 4th | Michael Ium | $164,319 |
| 5th | David Woo | $115,339 |
| 6th | Noam Freedman | $83,739 |
| 7th | Tom Dobrilovic | $63,200 |
| 8th | Luis Sanchez | $47,400 |
| 9th | Thai Ton | $36,340 |

=== Event 28: $3,000 No-Limit Hold'em ===
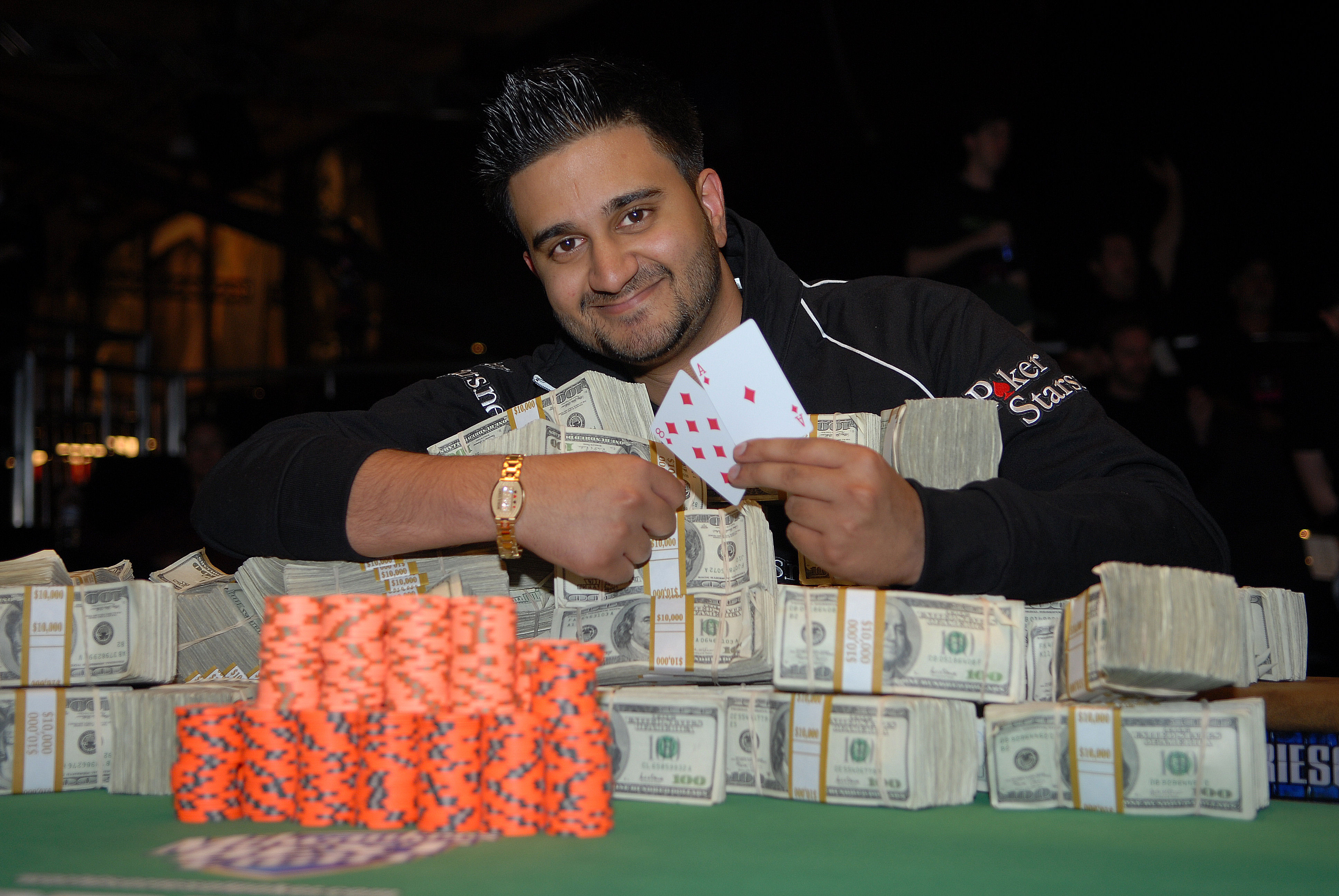
Pillai at the 2007 WSOP

- 3-day event: Sunday, June 17, 2007, to Tuesday, June 19, 2007
- Number of buy-ins: 827
- Total prize pool: $2,282,520
- Number of payouts: 81
- Winning hand: A♦ 8♦

Final table
| Place | Name | Prize |
|---|---|---|
| 1st | Shankar Pillai (1/1) | $527,829 |
| 2nd | Beth Shak | $328,683 |
| 3rd | Jason Song | $212,274 |
| 4th | Dustin Holmes | $141,516 |
| 5th | Ben Fineman | $100,431 |
| 6th | Phil Hellmuth* (1/11) | $76,464 |
| 7th | Perry Friedman (0/1) | $57,063 |
| 8th | Brett Richey | $42,227 |
| 9th | Daniel Corbin | $30,814 |

=== Event 29: $1,500 Razz ===
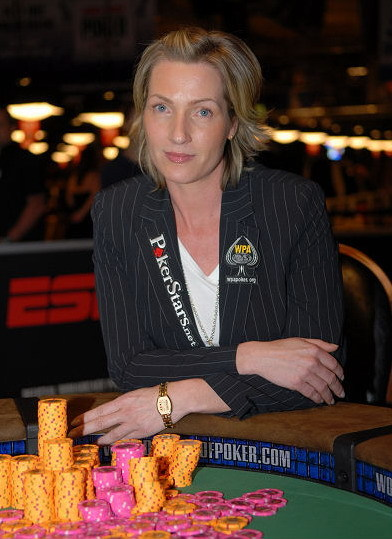
Thater at the 2007 WSOP

- 3-day event: Sunday, June 17, 2007, to Tuesday, June 19, 2007
- Number of buy-ins: 341
- Total prize pool: $465,465
- Number of payouts: 32
- Winning hand: 8-2-9-3-5-3-4 (card suits do not matter in Razz)

Final table
| Place | Name | Prize |
|---|---|---|
| 1st | Katja Thater (1/1) | $132,653 |
| 2nd | Larry St. Jean | $73,311 |
| 3rd | O'Neil Longson (0/3) | $46,547 |
| 4th | Paul Clark (0/3) | $31,186 |
| 5th | Denny Axel | $24,204 |
| 6th | Mark Vos (0/1) | $18,836 |
| 7th | Men Nguyen (0/6) | $14,197 |
| 8th | Thomas Daubert | $10,473 |

=== Event 30: $2,500 No-Limit Hold'em (6-handed) ===
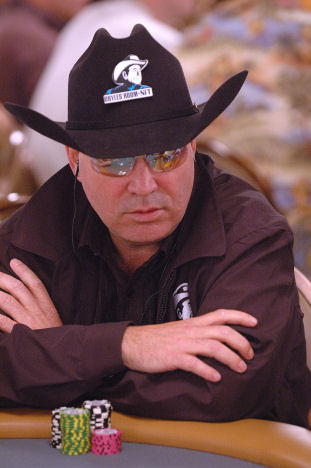
Corkins at the 2006 World Series of Poker

- 3-day event: Monday, June 18, 2007, to Wednesday, June 20, 2007
- Number of buy-ins: 847
- Total prize pool: $1,948,100
- Number of payouts: 78
- Winning hand: K♦ 10♠

Final table
| Place | Name | Prize |
|---|---|---|
| 1st | Hoyt Corkins (1/2) | $515,065 |
| 2nd | Terrence Chan | $287,345 |
| 3rd | William Lin | $196,758 |
| 4th | Alan Sass | $132,471 |
| 5th | Kelly Vande-Mheen | $96,431 |
| 6th | James Pittman | $63,118 |

=== Event 31: $5,000 World Championship Heads-Up No-Limit Hold'em ===
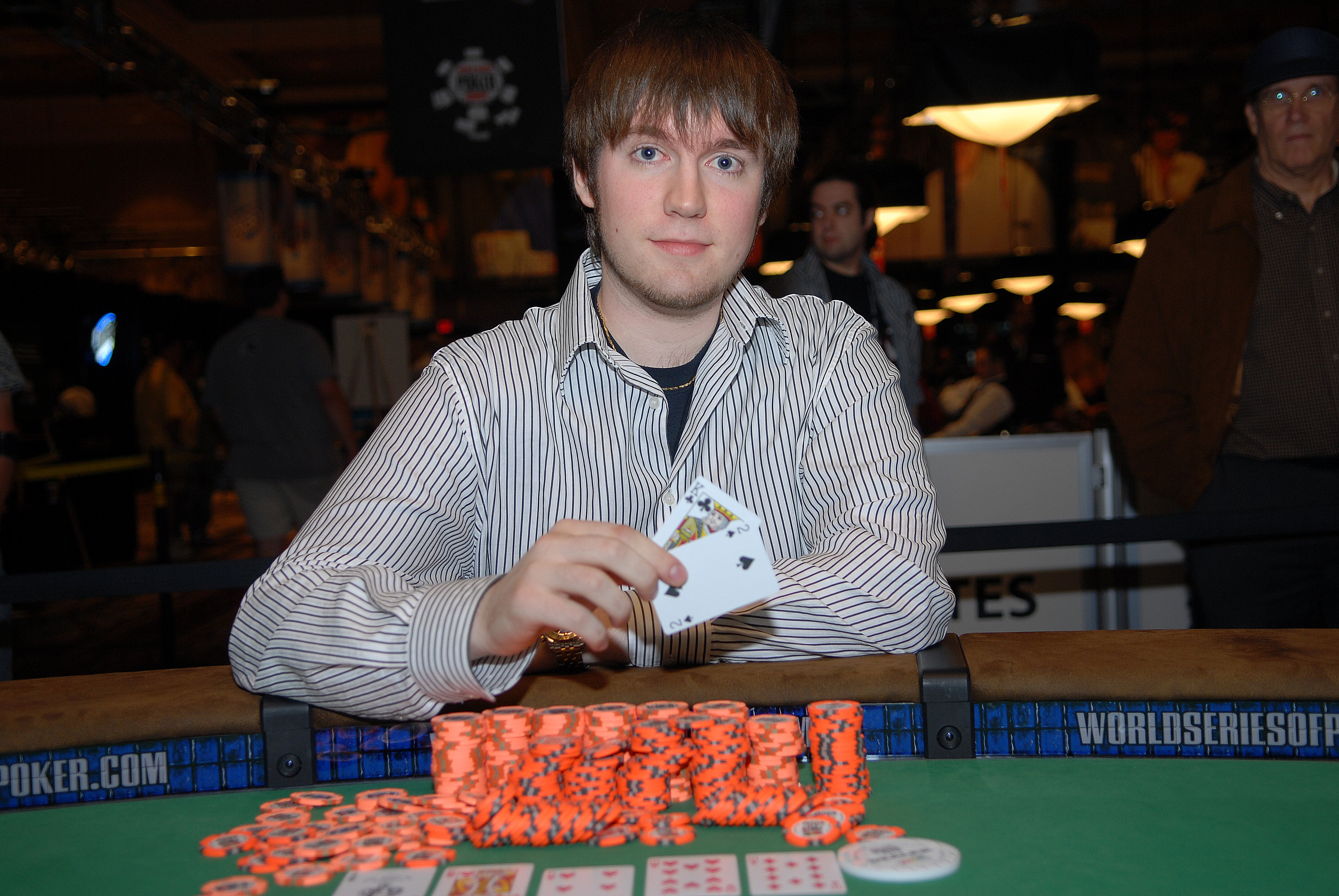
Schreiber after winning the $5,000 Heads-Up championship

- 3-day event: Tuesday, June 19, 2007, to Thursday, June 21, 2007
- Number of buy-ins: 392
- Total prize pool: $1,842,400
- Number of payouts: 64
- Winning hand: K♣ 2♠

Top finishers
| Place | Name | Prize |
|---|---|---|
| 1st | Dan Schreiber (1/1) | $425,594 |
| 2nd | Mark Muchnik | $230,300 |
| SF | Keith Block | $128,968 |
| SF | Vanessa Selbst | $128,968 |
| QF | Steve Sarrafzadeh | $46,060 |
| QF | Jared Davis | $46,060 |
| QF | Shannon Shorr | $46,060 |
| QF | Toto Leonidas (0/1) | $46,060 |

"SF" denotes players who lost in the semifinal round of the tournament and "QF" denotes players who lost in the quarterfinal round.

=== Event 32: $2,000 Seven-Card Stud ===
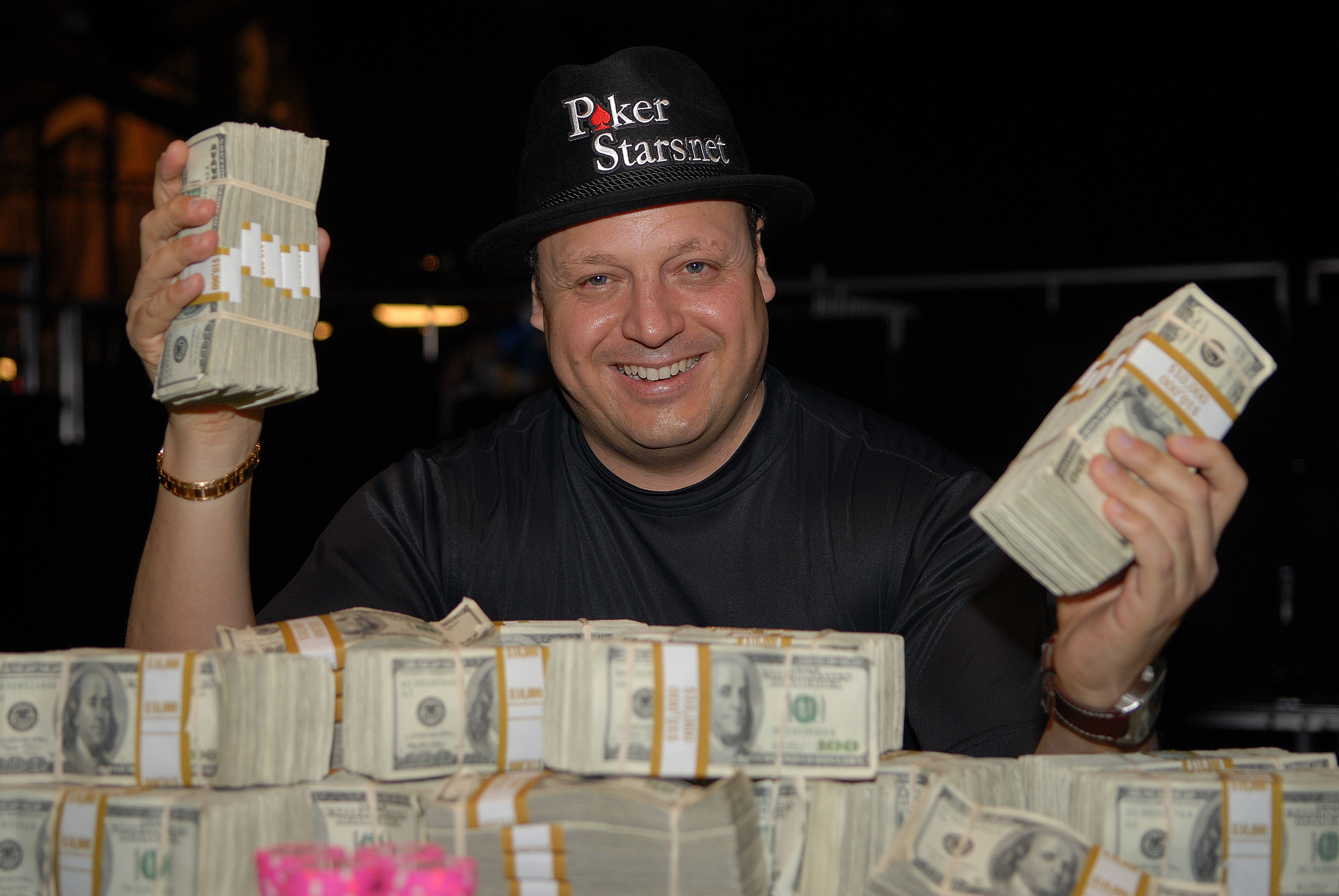
Lisandro after winning the $2,000 seven-card stud event

- 3-day event: Tuesday, June 19, 2007, to Thursday, June 21, 2007
- Number of buy-ins: 213
- Total prize pool: $387,660
- Number of payouts: 24
- Winning hand: A-A-9♦ 8♠ A♠ 5♠ X

Final table
| Place | Name | Prize |
|---|---|---|
| 1st | Jeffrey Lisandro (1/1) | $118,426 |
| 2nd | Nick Frangos | $65,902 |
| 3rd | Nesbitt Coburn | $42,643 |
| 4th | Severin Walser | $28,105 |
| 5th | Daniel Negreanu (0/3) | $21,321 |
| 6th | Greg Pappas | $16,282 |
| 7th | David Brody | $12,405 |
| 8th | Farshad "Ben" Cohen | $8,916 |

=== Event 33: $1,500 Pot-Limit Omaha with rebuys ===
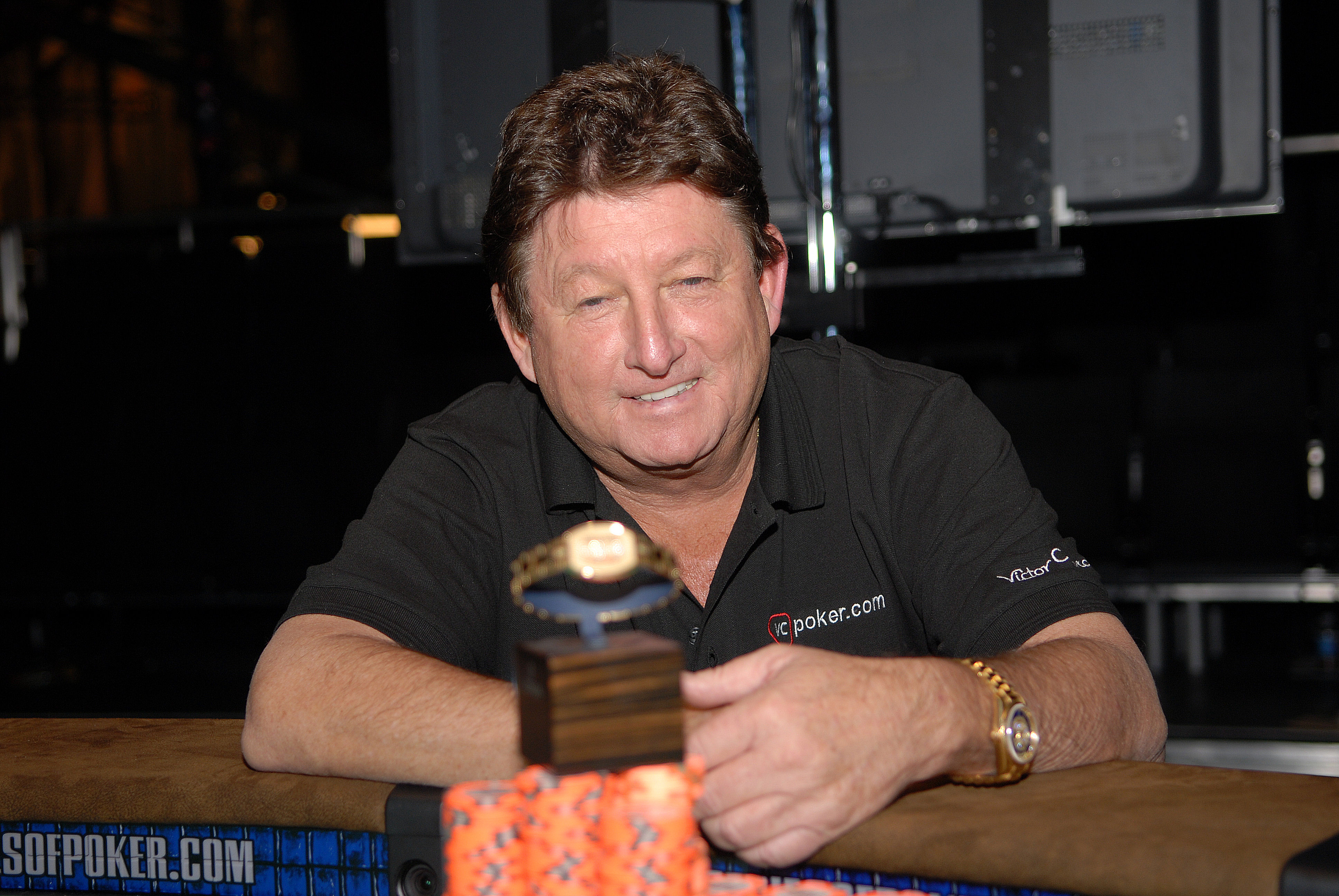
Smurfit at the 2007 WSOP

- 3-day event: Wednesday, June 20, 2007, to Friday, June 22, 2007
- Number of buy-ins: 293
- Number of rebuys/addons: 880
- Total prize pool: $1,684,305
- Number of payouts: 27
- Winning hand: Q♣ J♣ 8♦ 2♦

Final table
| Place | Name | Prize |
|---|---|---|
| 1st | Alan Smurfit (1/1) | $464,867 |
| 2nd | Qushqar Morad | $279,595 |
| 3rd | Van Marcus | $190,326 |
| 4th | Chris Bjorin | $129,691 |
| 5th | Chau Giang (0/3) | $96,005 |
| 6th | Brandon Adams | $75,794 |
| 7th | Robert Fellner | $57,266 |
| 8th | Sunny Nijran | $42,108 |
| 9th | Hilbert Shirey (0/3) | $30,317 |

=== Event 34: $3,000 Limit Hold'em ===
- 3-day event: Wednesday, June 20, 2007, to Friday, June 22, 2007
- Number of buy-ins: 296
- Total prize pool: $816,960
- Number of payouts: 27
- Winning hand: K♣ 6♦

Final table
| Place | Name | Prize |
|---|---|---|
| 1st | Alexander Borteh (1/1) | $225,483 |
| 2nd | Brandon Wong | $135,615 |
| 3rd | Shawn Keller | $92,316 |
| 4th | David Pham (0/2) | $62,906 |
| 5th | Matthew Kelly | $46,567 |
| 6th | Vivek Rajkumar | $36,763 |
| 7th | Michael Byrne | $27,777 |
| 8th | Marco Johnson | $20,424 |
| 9th | Petri Pollanen | $14,705 |

=== Event 35: $1,500 No-Limit Hold'em ===
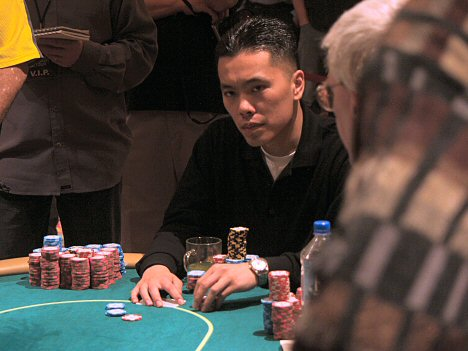
Nam Le in the World Poker Tour Five Diamond World Poker Classic event

- 3-day event: Thursday, June 21, 2007, to Saturday, June 23, 2007
- Number of buy-ins: 2,541
- Total prize pool: $3,468,465
- Number of payouts: 271
- Winning hand: A♥ 7♦

Final table
| Place | Name | Prize |
|---|---|---|
| 1st | Ryan Young (1/1) | $615,955 |
| 2nd | Dustin Dirksen | $381,381 |
| 3rd | Nam Le | $239,230 |
| 4th | John Esposito | $156,020 |
| 5th | Michael Trimby | $109,214 |
| 6th | Paul Cheung | $79,743 |
| 7th | Raj Jain | $62,048 |
| 8th | Darren Glenn | $46,806 |
| 9th | Joe Holmes | $36,751 |

=== Event 36: $5,000 World Championship Omaha Hi-Low Split-8 or Better ===
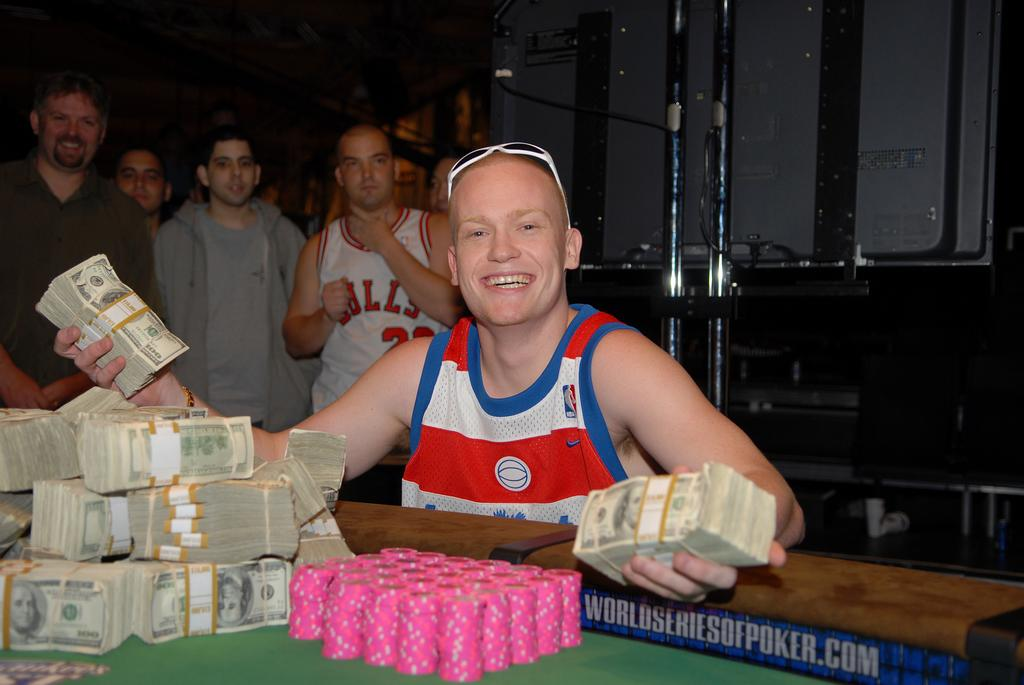
Guth at the 2007 WSOP

- 3-day event: Thursday, June 21, 2007, to Saturday, June 23, 2007
- Number of buy-ins: 280
- Total prize pool: $1,316,000
- Number of payouts: 27
- Winning hand: 10♦ 9♦ 9♥ 3♥

Final table
| Place | Name | Prize |
|---|---|---|
| 1st | John Guth (1/1) | $363,216 |
| 2nd | Robert Stevanovski | $218,456 |
| 3rd | David Flores | $148,708 |
| 4th | Max Reynard | $101,332 |
| 5th | Greg Jameson | $75,012 |
| 6th | Randy Jensen | $59,220 |
| 7th | Michael Pollowitz | $44,744 |
| 8th | Bart Hanson | $32,900 |
| 9th | Jim Grove | $23,688 |

=== Event 37: $2,000 Pot-Limit Hold'em ===
- 3-day event: Friday, June 22, 2007, to Sunday, June 24, 2007
- Number of buy-ins: 599
- Total prize pool: $1,090,180
- Number of payouts: 54
- Winning hand: J♥ J♦

Final table
| Place | Name | Prize |
|---|---|---|
| 1st | Greg Hopkins | $269,274 |
| 2nd | Jason Newburger | $165,707 |
| 3rd | Yuval Bronshtein | $109,018 |
| 4th | Pete Lawson | $72,497 |
| 5th | David Zarrin | $52,874 |
| 6th | Robert Collison | $41,427 |
| 7th | Gioi Luong | $31,070 |
| 8th | Ray Coburn | $22,894 |
| 9th | Bryan O'Connell | $16,353 |

=== Event 38: $1,500 No-Limit Hold'em ===
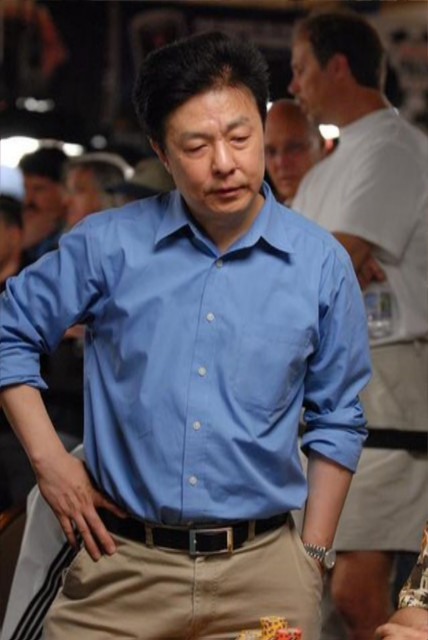
Cheung at the 2007 WSOP

- 3-day event: Saturday, June 23, 2007, to Monday, June 25, 2007
- Number of buy-ins: 2,778
- Total prize pool: $3,791,970
- Number of payouts: 270
- Winning hand: A♣ K♦

Final table
| Place | Name | Prize |
|---|---|---|
| 1st | Robert Cheung (1/1) | $673,628 |
| 2nd | Richard Murnick | $417,117 |
| 3rd | Erica Schoenberg | $261,646 |
| 4th | John Kranyak | $170,639 |
| 5th | Andrew Lee | $119,447 |
| 6th | Chris Bjorin | $87,215 |
| 7th | Suey Wong | $68,255 |
| 8th | Anthony Espo | $51,192 |
| 9th | Nick Goodall | $40,195 |

=== Event 39: $50,000 World Championship H.O.R.S.E. ===
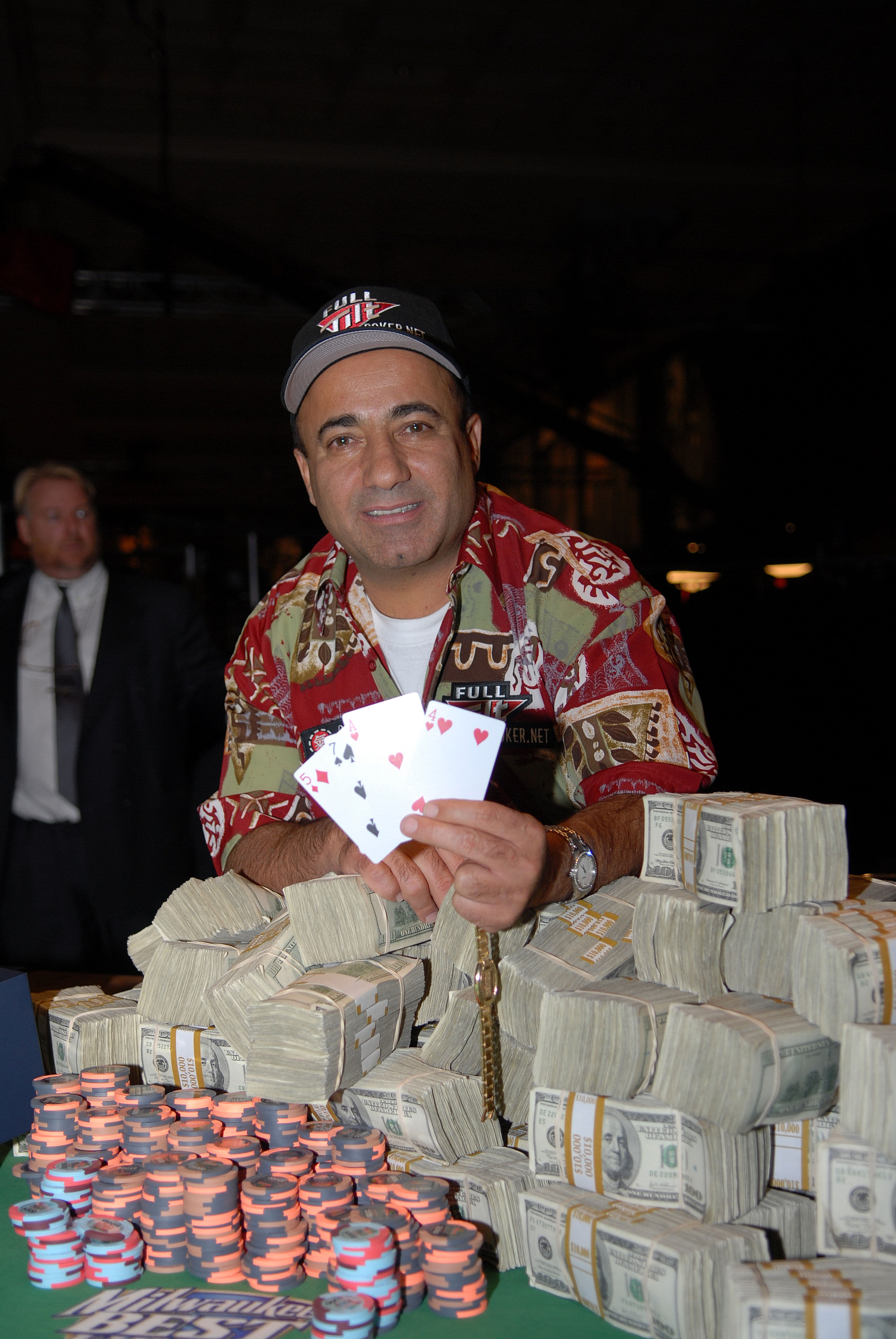
Deeb after winning the $50,000 H.O.R.S.E Event

- 5-day event: Sunday, June 24, 2007, to Thursday, June 28, 2007
- Number of buy-ins: 148
- Total prize pool: $7,104,000
- Number of payouts: 16
- Winning hand: A♥ 7♠ 4♥ 5♦ 5♥ 9♣ 8♠ (Seven Card Stud 8 or better)

Final table
| Place | Name | Prize |
|---|---|---|
| 1st | Freddy Deeb (1/2) | $2,276,832 |
| 2nd | Bruno Fitoussi | $1,278,720 |
| 3rd | John Hanson | $852,480 |
| 4th | Amnon Filippi | $586,080 |
| 5th | Kenny Tran | $444,000 |
| 6th | David Singer | $337,440 |
| 7th | Barry Greenstein (0/2) | $259,296 |
| 8th | Thor Hansen (0/2) | $188,256 |

The $7.1 million prize pool and $2.2 million prize were the largest prizes in poker history for a non-Main WSOP event.

=== Event 40: $1,500 Mixed Hold'em Limit/No-Limit ===
Goldberg at the 2007 WSOP

- 3-day event: Sunday, June 24, 2007, to Tuesday, June 26, 2007
- Number of buy-ins: 620
- Total prize pool: $846,300
- Number of payouts: 63
- Winning hand: 10♥ 7♥

Final table
| Place | Name | Prize |
|---|---|---|
| 1st | Fred Goldberg (1/1) | $204,935 |
| 2nd | Rene Mouritsen | $125,895 |
| 3rd | Christoph Niesert | $82,804 |
| 4th | Scott Bohlman | $54,498 |
| 5th | Kevin Marcotte | $39,289 |
| 6th | Joe Brandenburg | $30,418 |
| 7th | Michael Craig | $22,813 |
| 8th | Reza Zand | $16,899 |
| 9th | Karlo López | $12,252 |

=== Event 41: $1,000 World Championship Seniors No-Limit Hold'em ===
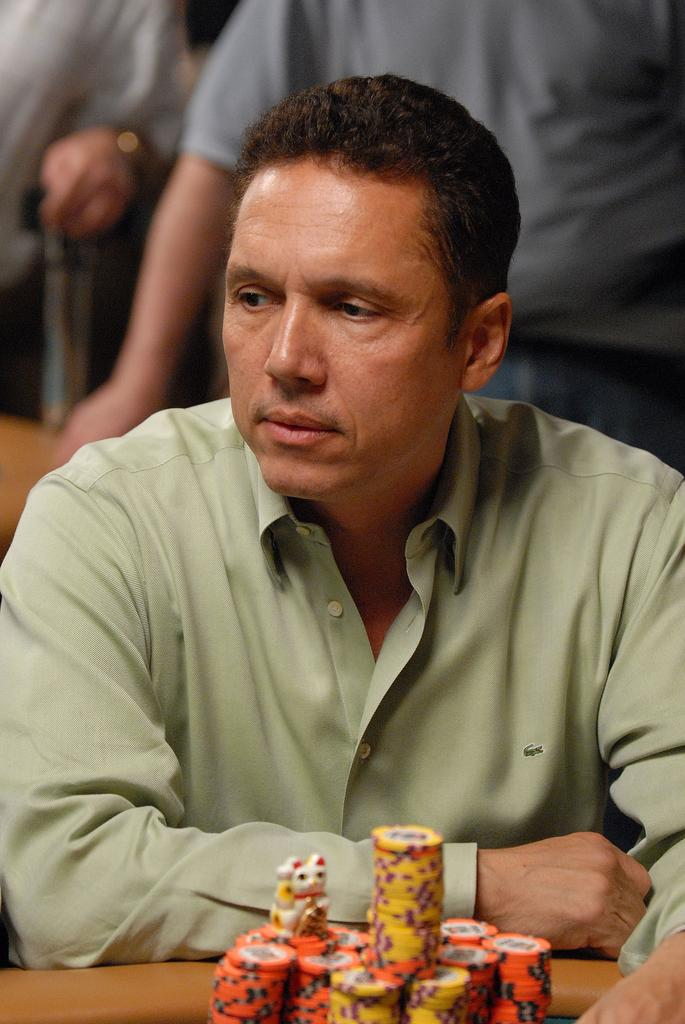
Bennett at the 2007 WSOP

- 3-day event: Monday, June 25, 2007, to Wednesday, June 27, 2007
- Number of buy-ins: 1,882
- Total prize pool: $1,721,620
- Number of payouts: 153

Final table
| Place | Name | Prize |
|---|---|---|
| 1st | Ernest Bennett (1/1) | $348,423 |
| 2nd | Tony Korfman | $217,503 |
| 3rd | Rod Clarida | $142,147 |
| 4th | Ed Smith | $95,907 |
| 5th | Thomas Catanzaro | $65,080 |
| 6th | Leon Lewis | $47,953 |
| 7th | Jack Deutsch | $35,965 |
| 8th | Ray Abels | $26,546 |
| 9th | Charles Anderson | $20,209 |

Bennett and Korfman made a deal before heads-up play began. Korfman agreed to let Bennett win the title uncontested if Bennett agreed to split the prize money. They split the cash evenly with each taking home roughly $293,000. With 1,882 entrants over the age of 55, this was the largest Senior's event ever.

=== Event 42: $1,500 Pot-Limit Omaha Hi-Low Split-8 or Better ===
- 3-day event: Monday, June 25, 2007, to Wednesday, June 27, 2007
- Number of buy-ins: 687
- Total prize pool: $937,755
- Number of payouts: 63
- Winning hand: A♣ A♦ 3♠ Q♣

Final table
| Place | Name | Prize |
|---|---|---|
| 1st | Lukasz Dumanski (1/1) | $227,454 |
| 2nd | David Bach | $139,725 |
| 3rd | James Tolley | $91,900 |
| 4th | Gene Timberlake | $60,485 |
| 5th | Chad Brown | $43,606 |
| 6th | Dario Alioto | $33,759 |
| 7th | Thomas Hant | $25,319 |
| 8th | Mark Wilds | $18,755 |
| 9th | George Danzer | $13,597 |

=== Event 43: $2,000 Limit Hold'em ===
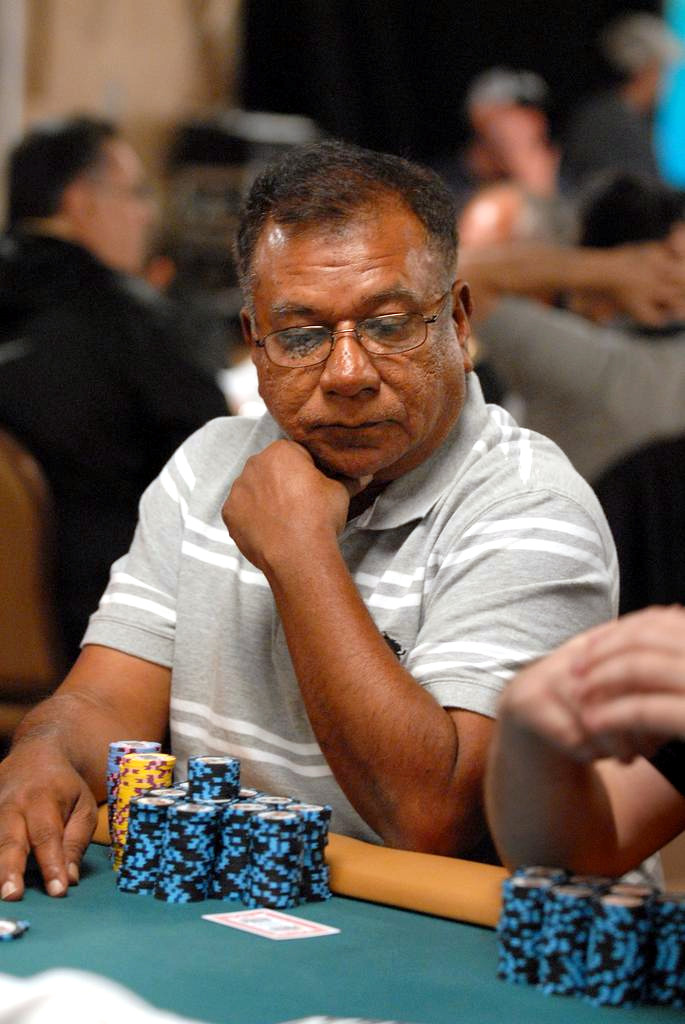
Ahmad at the 2007 WSOP

- 3-day event: Tuesday, June 26, 2007, to Thursday, June 28, 2007
- Number of buy-ins: 472
- Total prize pool: $859,040
- Number of payouts: 45
- Winning hand: Q♥ 4♥

Final table
| Place | Name | Prize |
|---|---|---|
| 1st | Saif Ahmad (1/1) | $217,329 |
| 2nd | William Jensen | $133,151 |
| 3rd | Michael Graffeo | $88,481 |
| 4th | Justin Pechie | $59,274 |
| 5th | Tommy Rounds | $43,811 |
| 6th | Hal Havlisch | $34,362 |
| 7th | Robert Pacleb | $25,771 |
| 8th | Joe Mandia | $18,899 |
| 9th | Gerald Kane | $13,745 |

=== Event 44: $2,000 Omaha Hi-Low Split-8 or Better ===
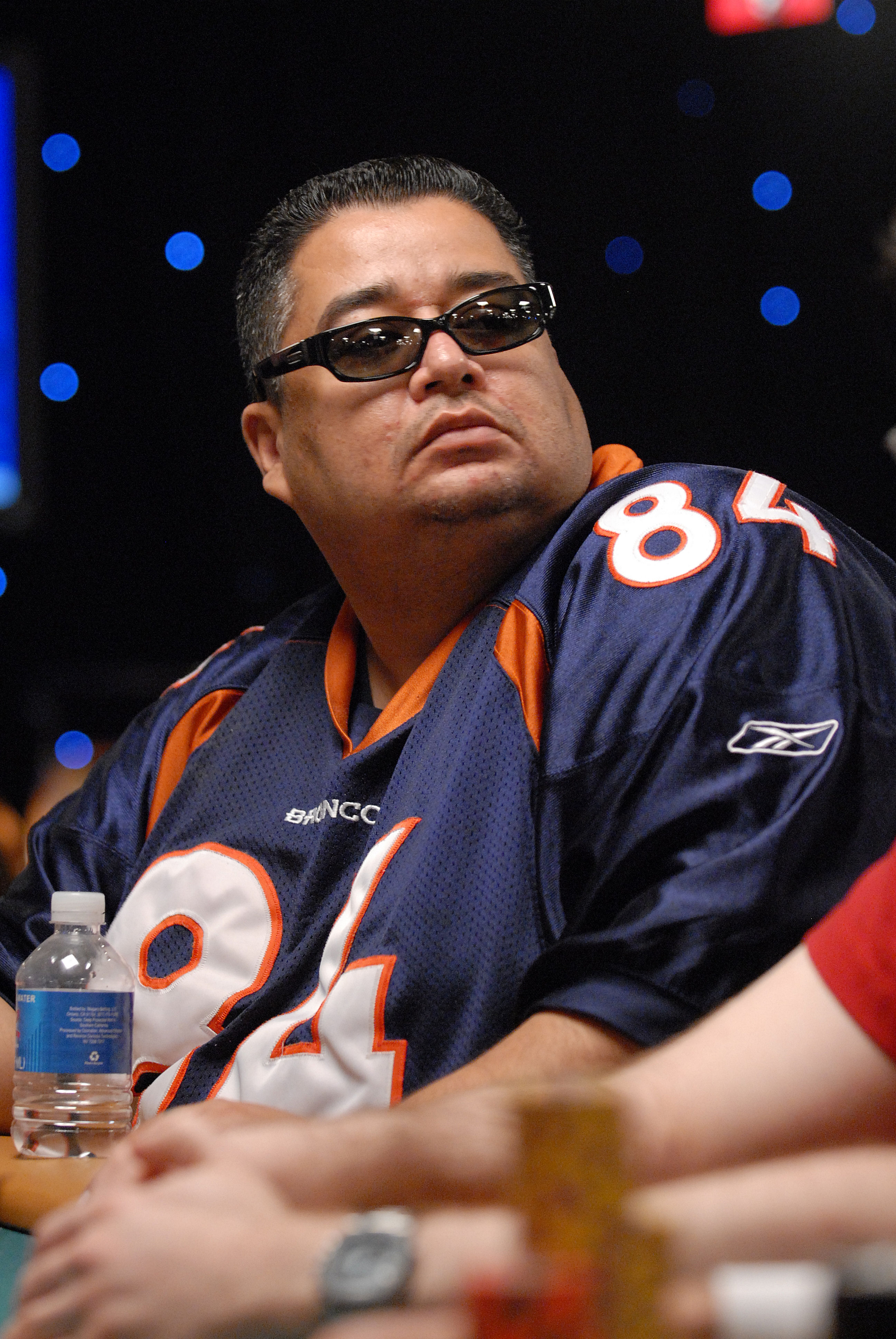
O'Dell at the 2007 WSOP

- 3-day event: Wednesday, June 27, 2007, to Friday, June 29, 2007
- Number of buy-ins: 534
- Total prize pool: $971,880
- Number of payouts: 54
- Winning hand: 2♥ 3♦ 9♣ Q♦

Final table
| Place | Name | Prize |
|---|---|---|
| 1st | Frankie O'Dell (1/2) | $240,057 |
| 2nd | Thang Luu | $147,726 |
| 3rd | Martin "Dick" Corpuz | $97,188 |
| 4th | Marcel Lüske | $64,630 |
| 5th | Marvin Ryan | $47,136 |
| 6th | Jess Robinson | $36,931 |
| 7th | Ming Lee | $27,699 |
| 8th | Stuart Paterson | $20,409 |
| 9th | Mitch Maples | $14,578 |

=== Event 45: $5,000 No-Limit Hold'em (6-handed) ===
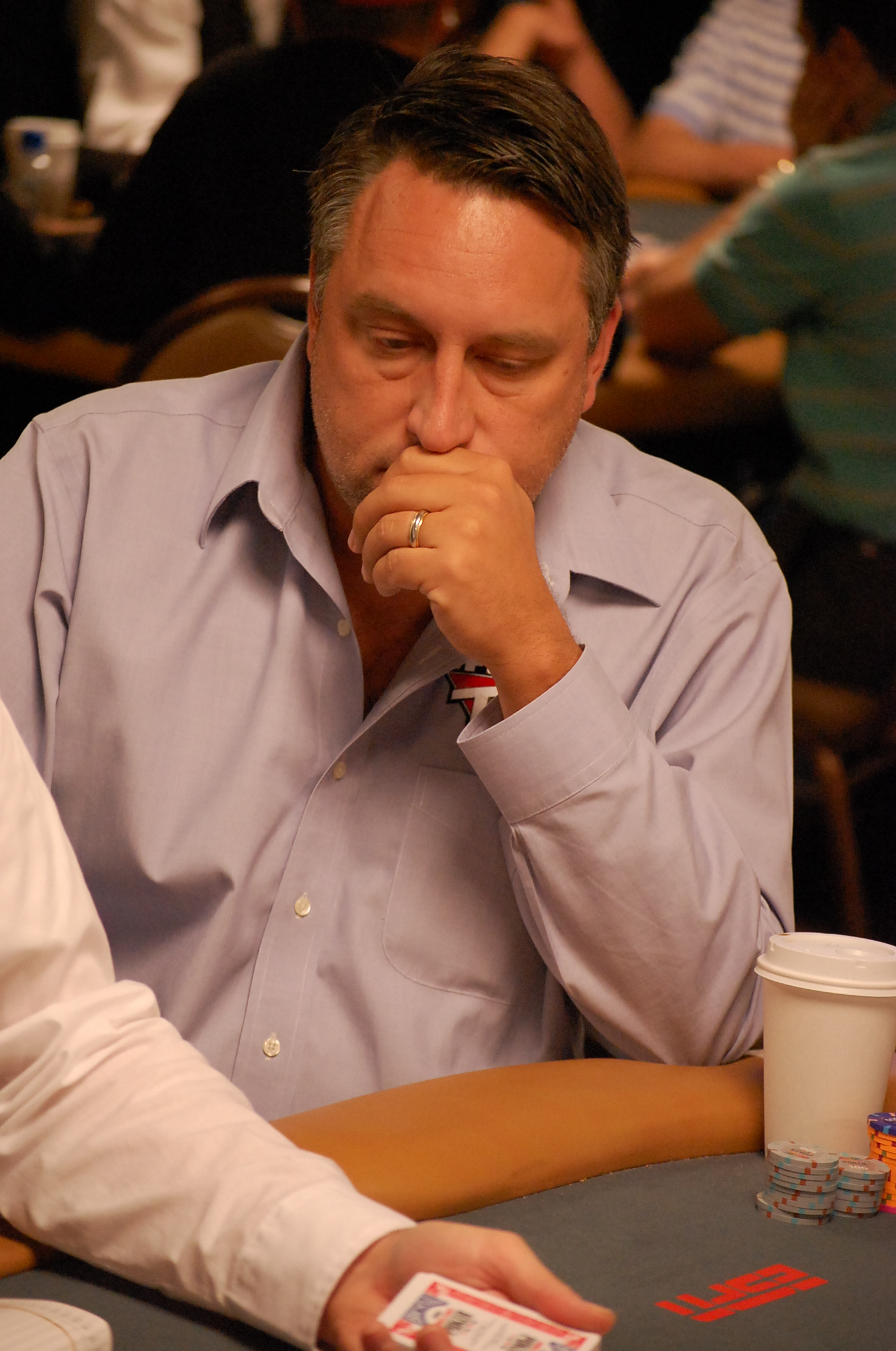
Edler at the 2007 WSOP

- 3-day event: Thursday, June 28, 2007, to Saturday, June 30, 2007
- Number of buy-ins: 728
- Total prize pool: $3,421,600
- Number of payouts: 78
- Winning hand: A♣ 10♠

Final table
| Place | Name | Prize |
|---|---|---|
| 1st | Bill Edler (1/1) | $904,672 |
| 2nd | Alex Bolotin | $504,686 |
| 3rd | Erik Friberg | $345,582 |
| 4th | Greg Pohler | $232,669 |
| 5th | Dutch Boyd (0/1) | $169,369 |
| 6th | Gioi Luong | $110,860 |

=== Event 46: $1,000 Seven-Card Stud Hi-Low Split-8 or Better ===
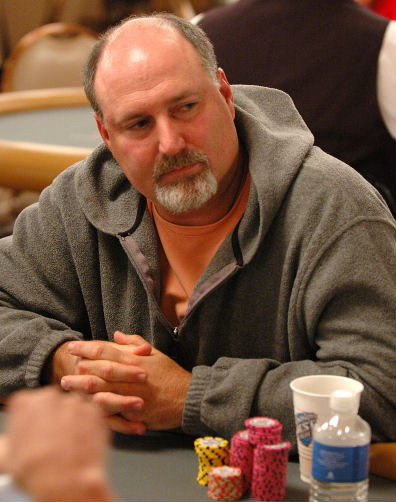
Schneider at the 2006 World Series of Poker

- 3-day event: Thursday, June 28, 2007, to Saturday, June 30, 2007
- Number of buy-ins: 668
- Total prize pool: $607,880
- Number of payouts: 64
- Winning hand:

Final table
| Place | Name | Prize |
|---|---|---|
| 1st | Tom Schneider (2/2) | $147,713 |
| 2nd | Hoyt Verner | $82,064 |
| 3rd | Miguel de la Cruz | $51,670 |
| 4th | Scotty Nguyen (0/4) | $31,610 |
| 5th | Saundra Taylor | $24,619 |
| 6th | Tony Ma (0/2) | $19,270 |
| 7th | Tommy Hang | $14,711 |
| 8th | Woody Deck | $11,063 |

=== Event 47: $2,000 No-Limit Hold'em ===
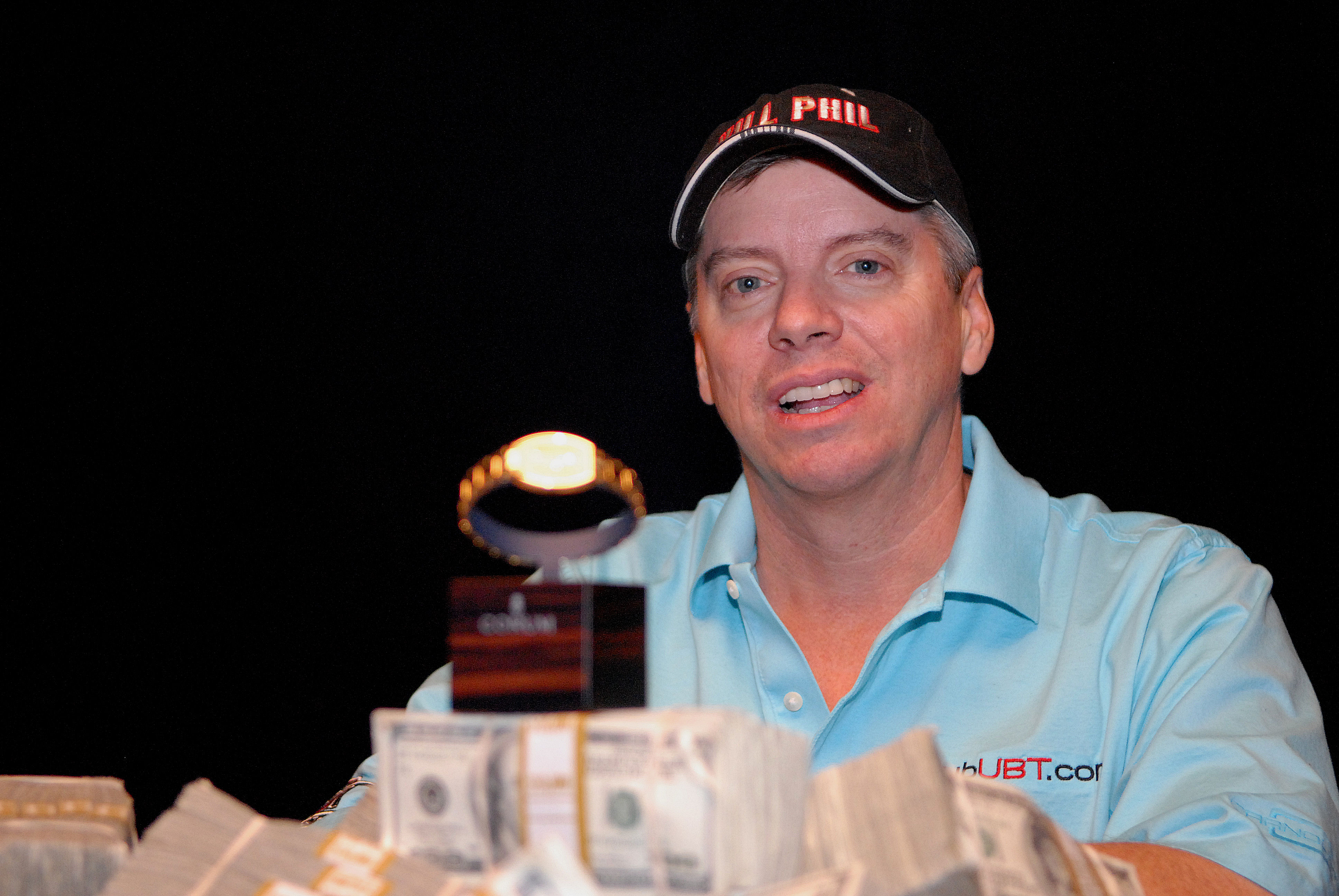
Rodman at the 2007 WSOP

- 3-day event: Friday, June 29, 2007, to Sunday, July 1, 2007
- Number of buy-ins: 2,038
- Total prize pool: $3,709,160
- Number of payouts: 198
- Winning hand: A♣ J♦

Final table
| Place | Name | Prize |
|---|---|---|
| 1st | Blair Rodman (1/1) | $707,898 |
| 2nd | Amato Galasso | $448,808 |
| 3rd | Klein Kim Bach | $289,314 |
| 4th | Anna Wroblewski | $192,876 |
| 5th | Steve Crawford | $135,384 |
| 6th | Roland De Wolfe | $98,293 |
| 7th | Joe Pelton | $74,183 |
| 8th | David Schnettler | $55,637 |
| 9th | Mark McKibben | $42,655 |

=== Event 48: $1,000 Deuce to Seven Triple Draw Lowball with rebuys ===
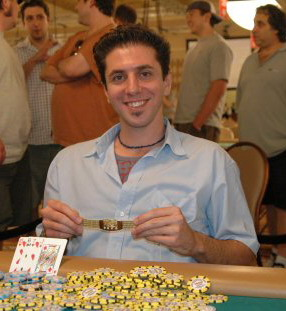
Amit shows his gold WSOP bracelet after he won it in the 2005 World Series of Poker.

- 3-day event: Friday, June 29, 2007, to Sunday, July 1, 2007
- Number of buy-ins: 209
- Number of rebuys/addons: 546
- Total prize pool: $721,804
- Number of payouts: 24
- Winning hand: 7-6-4-3-2

Final table
| Place | Name | Prize |
|---|---|---|
| 1st | Rafi Amit (1/2) | $227,005 |
| 2nd | Lenny Martin | $128,120 |
| 3rd | Anthony Lellouche | $84,812 |
| 4th | Jon Shoreman | $57,383 |
| 5th | Eugene Ji | $41,504 |
| 6th | Mark Bartlog | $27,068 |

=== Event 49: $1,500 No-Limit Hold'em ===
- 3-day event: Saturday, June 30, 2007, to Monday, July 2, 2007
- Number of buy-ins: 3,151
- Total prize pool: $4,301,115
- Number of payouts: 324
- Winning hand: A♦ 7♠

Final table
| Place | Name | Prize |
|---|---|---|
| 1st | Chandrasekhar Billavara (1/1) | $722,914 |
| 2nd | Taylor Douglas | $467,101 |
| 3rd | John Hunt | $292,476 |
| 4th | Leandro Pimentel | $189,249 |
| 5th | Duane Felix | $131,184 |
| 6th | Cort Kibler-Melby | $96,775 |
| 7th | Ray Spencer | $75,270 |
| 8th | Greg Mueller | $55,914 |
| 9th | Lewis Titterton | $45,162 |

This event set a World Series of Poker non-main event and live poker attendance record with 3,151 entries breaking the previous record of 2,998 set earlier in the third event of the 2007 WSOP. At the time it was also the third-highest entry total in all live Poker events behind just the 2006 and 2005 main events which had 8,773 and 5,619 entrants respectively.

=== Event 50: $10,000 World Championship Pot-Limit Omaha ===
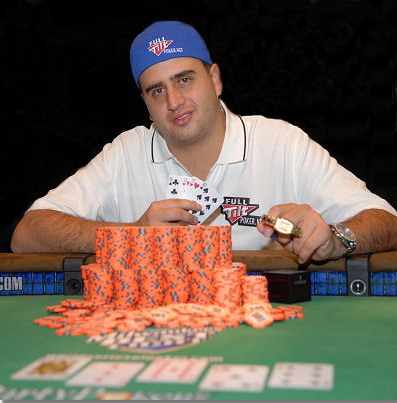
Mizrachi after winning the $10,000 World Championship Pot-Limit Omaha

- 3-day event: Sunday, July 1, 2007, to Tuesday, July 3, 2007
- Number of buy-ins: 314
- Total prize pool: $2,857,400
- Number of payouts: 36
- Winning hand: 10♠ 9♣ 9♥ 5♥

Final table
| Place | Name | Prize |
|---|---|---|
| 1st | Robert Mizrachi (1/1) | $768,889 |
| 2nd | Rene Mouritsen | $464,877 |
| 3rd | Patrik Antonius | $311,394 |
| 4th | Dau "Tommy" Ly | $209,564 |
| 5th | Marco Traniello | $156,435 |
| 6th | Doyle Brunson* (0/10) | $123,967 |
| 7th | Stephen Ladowsky | $92,975 |
| 8th | Jonas Flug-Entin | $69,363 |
| 9th | Steve Sung | $50,177 |

=== Event 51: $1,000 S.H.O.E. ===
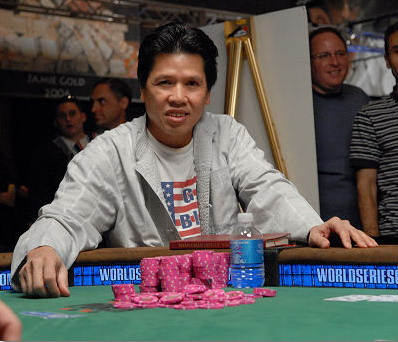
Bac at the 2007 WSOP

- 3-day event: Sunday, July 1, 2007, to Tuesday, July 3, 2007
- Number of buy-ins: 730
- Total prize pool: $664,300
- Number of payouts: 72
- Winning hand: 4♠ 7♠

Final table
| Place | Name | Prize |
|---|---|---|
| 1st | Dao Bac (1/1) | $157,975 |
| 2nd | Adam Geyer | $86,691 |
| 3rd | Chip Jett | $55,801 |
| 4th | Raymond Davis | $34,012 |
| 5th | Imre Leibold | $26,572 |
| 6th | Vladimir Shchemelev | $20,793 |
| 7th | Michael Craig | $15,943 |
| 8th | Pat Poels (0/2) | $11,957 |

=== Event 52: $1,000 No-Limit Hold'em with rebuys ===
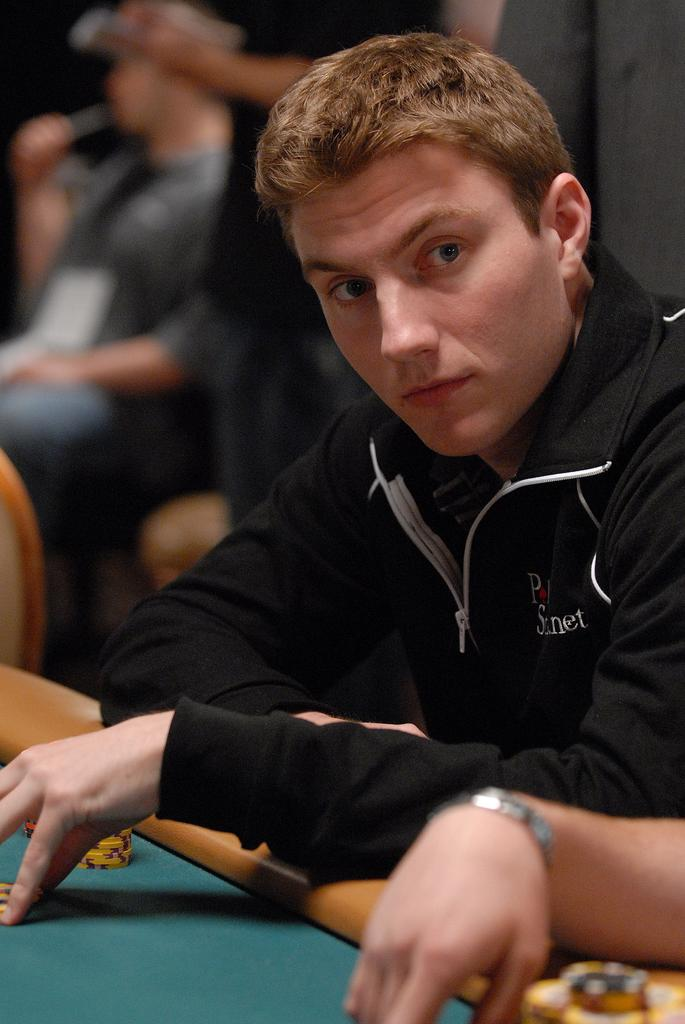
Graves at the 2007 WSOP

- 3-day event: Monday, July 2, 2007, to Wednesday, July 4, 2007
- Number of buy-ins: 1,048
- Number of rebuys/addons: 2,336
- Total prize pool: $3,226,609
- Number of payouts: 100
- Winning hand: 6♥ 5♠

Final table
| Place | Name | Prize |
|---|---|---|
| 1st | Michael Graves (1/1) | $742,121 |
| 2nd | Theo Tran | $387,193 |
| 3rd | Shawn Luman | $224,249 |
| 4th | Shawn Hattem | $161,330 |
| 5th | Chad Batista | $129,064 |
| 6th | Kris Tate | $112,931 |
| 7th | Isaac Haxton | $96,798 |
| 8th | Arnold Spee | $80,665 |
| 9th | Thierry Cazals | $72,599 |

=== Event 53: $1,500 Limit Hold'em Shootout ===
- 2-day event: Tuesday, July 3, 2007, to Wednesday, July 4, 2007
- Number of buy-ins: 720
- Total prize pool: $982,800
- Number of payouts: 72
- Winning hand: K♥ Q♠

Final table
| Place | Name | Prize |
|---|---|---|
| 1st | Ram Vaswani (1/1) | $217,438 |
| 2nd | Andy Ward | $124,816 |
| 3rd | Anh Van Nguyen | $83,538 |
| 4th | David Mosca | $58,968 |
| 5th | Ishak Noyan | $31,450 |
| 6th | Sondre Sagstuen | $19,656 |
| 7th | David Baker | $12,776 |
| 8th | Rayvenia Puckett | $9,582 |

=== Event 54: $5,000 World Championship No-Limit Deuce to Seven Draw Lowball with rebuys ===
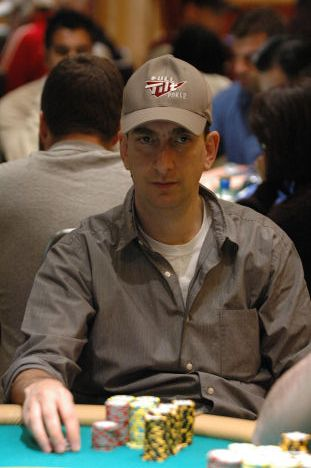
Seidel at the 2007 WSOP

- 2-day event: Wednesday, July 4, 2007, to Thursday, July 5, 2007
- Number of buy-ins: 78
- Number of rebuys/addons: 226
- Total prize pool: $1,476,000
- Number of payouts: 7
- Winning hand: 8-7-6-5-3

Final table
| Place | Name | Prize |
|---|---|---|
| 1st | Erik Seidel (1/8) | $538,835 |
| 2nd | Chad Brown | $324,777 |
| 3rd | Shawn Sheikhan | $206,676 |
| 4th | Lamar Wilkinson | $162,389 |
| 5th | Andrew Black | $118,101 |
| 6th | Freddy Deeb (1/2) | $73,813 |
| 7th | Todd Brunson (0/1) | $51,669 |

=== Event 55: $10,000 World Championship No-Limit Hold'em ===
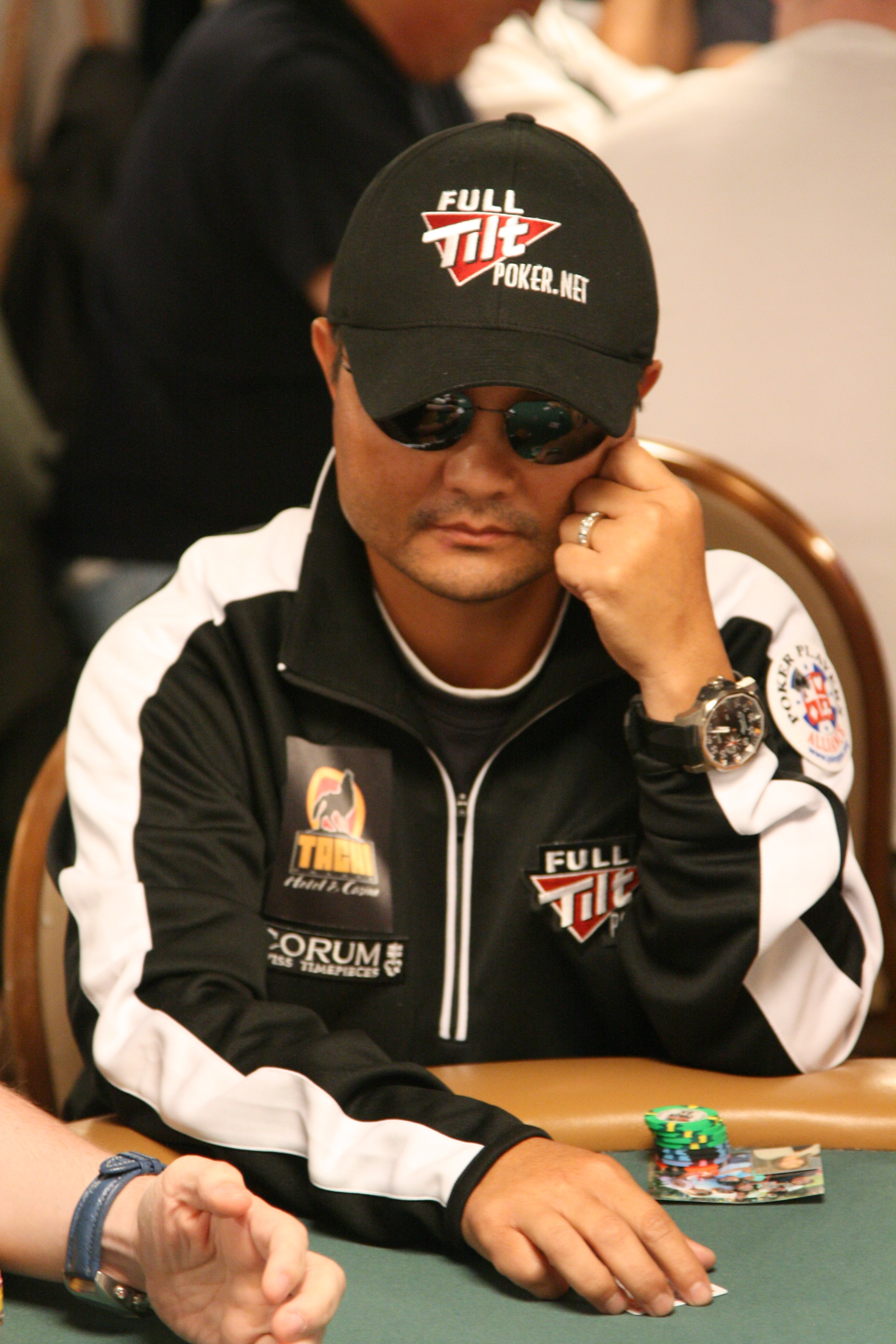
Yang at the 2008 WSOP

As the final event, in which the "World Champion of Poker" is crowned, this is considered the "Main Event".

- 12-day event: Friday, July 6, 2007, to Tuesday, July 17, 2007
- Number of buy-ins: 6,358
- Total prize pool: $59,784,954
- Number of payouts: 621
- Winning hand: 8♣ 8♦

Final table
| Place | Name | Prize |
|---|---|---|
| 1st | Jerry Yang (1/1) | $8,250,000 |
| 2nd | Tuan Lam | $4,840,981 |
| 3rd | Raymond Rahme | $3,048,025 |
| 4th | Alex Kravchenko (1/1) | $1,852,721 |
| 5th | Jon Kalmar | $1,255,069 |
| 6th | Hevad Khan | $956,243 |
| 7th | Lee Childs | $705,229 |
| 8th | Lee Watkinson (0/1) | $585,699 |
| 9th | Philip Hilm | $525,934 |
