= Ernest Bennett =

Ernest Bennett may refer to:

- Sir Ernest Bennett (politician) (1865–1947), British politician
- Ernest Bennett (poker player), American businessman and poker player
- Ernest Bennett (rugby league) (1879–1921), English rugby league footballer
- Ernest Sterndale Bennett (1884–1982), actor and theatre director in Canada
