= Lubarsky =

Lubarsky is a surname. Notable people with the surname include:

- Aaron Lubarsky, American documentary filmmaker
- Hal Lubarsky, American poker player
- Kronid Lyubarsky (1934–1996), Russian journalist, dissident, human rights activist and political prisoner

== See also ==
- Meanings of minor planet names: 2001–3000#318
