= Anna Wroblewski =

American poker player

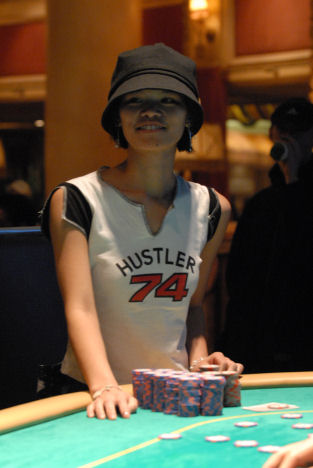
- Nicknames: the poker pixie vietcutie

World Series of Poker
- Bracelet: None
- Money finishes: 8
- Highest WSOP Main Event finish: None

World Poker Tour
- Title: None
- Final table: None
- Money finishes: 4

Anna Wroblewski (born c.1985 in Vietnam) is an American professional poker player, with multiple live tournament results that add up to over $1 million in career earnings.

== Early years ==
Wroblewski was born in Vietnam.

== World Series of Poker ==
Wroblewski has cashed eight times at the World Series of Poker, making her best result in the 2007 World Series of Poker $2,000 No Limit Hold'em event where she finished fourth, earning $192,876. The event was eventually won by Blair Rodman.

== Other poker events ==
Wroblewski at the World Poker Tour Fifth Annual Five Star World Poker Classic, cashed 16th in the $2,000 No Limit Hold'em event after having bought in through a satellite; a day later, she won the $3,000 No Limit Hold'em event that paid $337,395 for first. By winning she also won free entry into the $25,000 WPT Championship and cashed in 70th, earning $46,410.

At the 6th Annual Festa Al Lago Classic in 2008, Wroblewski won the $2,500 No Limit Hold'em event, earning $84,100.

Wroblewski has also cashed twice by making two final tables at the 2008 Aussie Millions preliminary events and finished in 4th and 7th.

As of 2010, her total live tournament winnings exceed $1,010,000.
