= Fred Goldberg =

American poker player

- Goldberg at the 2007 World Series of Poker

World Series of Poker
- Bracelet: 1
- Money finishes: 8
- Highest WSOP Main Event finish: 10th, 2006

World Poker Tour
- Title: None
- Final table: 1
- Money finishes: 5

Fred Goldberg is an American professional poker player from Hollywood, Florida.

== Poker career ==
Goldberg's first major poker success came in the 2006 World Series of Poker Main Event, where he finished in 10th place winning $1,154,527. Goldberg was able to find continued success after the 2006 WSOP. He finished 48th in the 2008 WSOP 2,000 no-limit hold 'em event earning $7,823. He was eliminated in 2008 WSOP Main Event by Brian "ZBT" Horton and did not cash.

In 2011, Goldberg entered the final table in the Borgata Poker Open as second in chips. He eventually finished in fourth place earning $280,925. Controversy erupted when Goldberg confronted eventual winner Bahbak Oboodi's rail, resulting in fans being ejected from the audience.

He was known for bearing a strong resemblance to Chris Moneymaker, the 2003 World Series of Poker Main Event champion. Since then, Goldberg has cashed in some World Poker Tour events and had some success at the 2007 World Series of Poker. At the 2007 World Series of Poker, he had five cashes and won his first career bracelet in a $1,500 buy-in Mixed Hold'em (Limit/No Limit) championship winning $204,935.

As of 2015, his total live tournament winnings exceed $2,400,000. His twelve cashes at the WSOP account for $1,412,891 of those winnings.

== World Series of Poker bracelets ==
World Series of Poker Bracelets
Year	Tournament	Prize (US$)
2007	$1,500 Mixed Hold 'Em (Limit/No-Limit)	$204,935
