= Ernest Bennett (poker player) =

American poker player

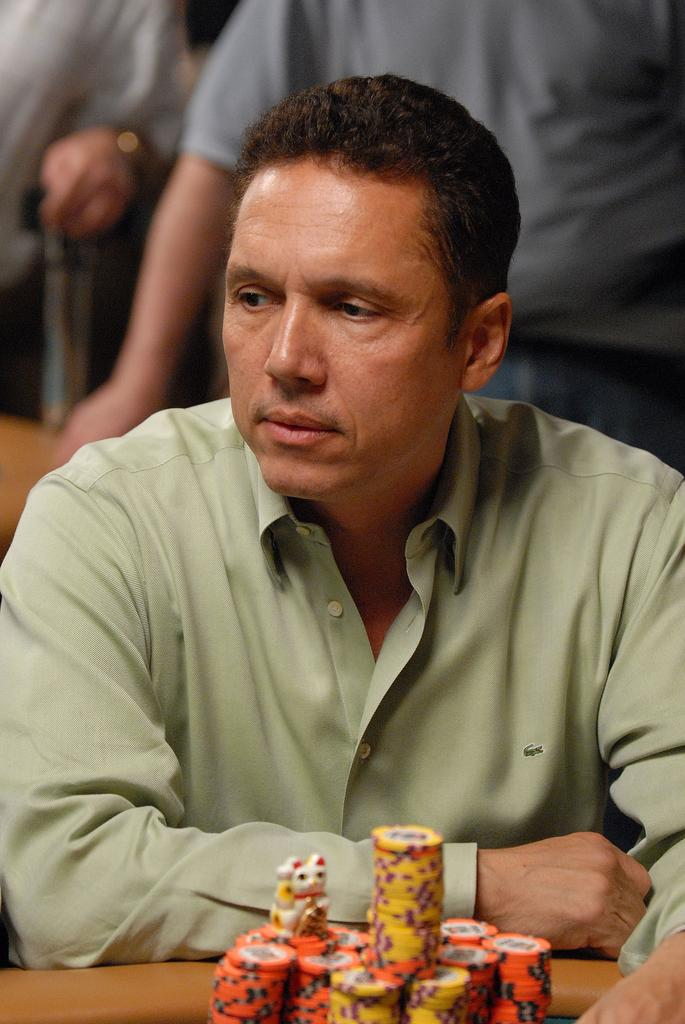
- Bennett at the 2007 World Series of Poker

World Series of Poker
- Bracelet: 1
- Money finishes: 2
- Highest WSOP Main Event finish: 'None'

Ernest Bennett is an American retired owner of a laundry chain in southern California. In 2007, he won a World Series of Poker bracelet in the $1,000 World Championship Seniors No Limit Hold'em. One must be at least 51 years of age in order to participate in a Seniors event. The 2007 event set a record of 1,882 entries; this bypassed the previous record of 1,184 by more than 30 percent.

As of 2023, Bennett has tournament winnings of over $540,000.

== World Series of Poker bracelets ==
Year	Tournament	Prize (US$)
2007	$1,000 World Championship Seniors No Limit Hold'em	$348,423
