= Hal Lubarsky =

American poker player

World Series of Poker
- Bracelet: None
- Money finishes: 4
- Highest WSOP Main Event finish: 197, 2007

Hal Lubarsky was an American professional poker player. He was the first blind poker player to ever cash in a World Series of Poker event.

== Background ==
Hal Lubarsky was 29 when he moved to Las Vegas with the dream of becoming a professional poker player. For over 15 years he routinely competed in the $150–300 H.O.R.S.E. games, where he played with many of the biggest names in poker. His poker playing days, however, came to an end in 2004 when he lost his vision to a hereditary dystrophy known as retinitis pigmentosa.

== The return to poker ==
After losing his vision, Hal became very depressed. His brother, an employee at the Mirage Casino mentioned this to Donna Harris, the Mirage Casino's Poker Manager. A few weeks later Donna called Hal to inform him that an old friend and Mirage Poker Room Shift Manager, Dennis Jackson was dying of cancer. She told him that the Mirage was going to have a charity tournament to raise money for Dennis and wanted to know if Hal would play. At first Hal declined, but Donna insisted stating that he could have a "reader" tell him what the cards were. After the tournament, Donna told Hal that not only was he always welcome at the Mirage, but that they would make him "as comfortable as possible."

== World Series of Poker ==
Shortly before the 2007 World Series of Poker, Hal contacted Harrah's Casino to see if he would be allowed to participate in the tournament with a reader. According to tournament rules, players are not allowed to confer or be helped by others. Harrah's management told him that he would not be allowed to have assistance at the table, to which Hal reportedly told them, "I'm not trying to give you trouble, but I could probably make more money suing you than playing in the tournament." Hal also mentioned William Rockwell, a player without arms whose mother had assisted him at the 2005 WSOP. Harrah's Casino quickly relented and agreed to allow Hal to participate with a reader.

With the help of Jo Adair, a poker dealer, Hal competed at the 2007 WSOP. Jo would whisper Hal's cards and the community cards into Hal's ear. He cashed in the 2007 WSOP Main Event.

Hal returned to the 2008 WSOP, with a new reader, where he "was a favorite of ESPN's television cameras." By the time Hal was knocked out of the 2008 tournament everybody was familiar with his story. Nolan Dalla made a short speech and the crowd gave Hal a standing ovation.

== Full Tilt Poker ==
When Hal first lost his vision, he started playing online with the help of friends who read the screen for him. In 2008, Hal was signed as a poker pro with Full Tilt Poker. In order to play online, Full Tilt Poker has provided Hal with a special computer program that reads the cards and chat messages.
