= World Championship of Online Poker =

Online poker tournament series

The World Championship of Online Poker (WCOOP) is an online poker tournament series sponsored by PokerStars. It is played on the PokerStars website in September.

Established in 2002, WCOOP is PokerStars' attempt to establish the online equivalent of the World Series of Poker. The WCOOP tournament series is the largest of its kind on the Internet.

The fifteen WCOOP events in 2005 generated $12,783,900 in prize money, making it not only the biggest ever online poker event, but the third biggest poker series (live or online) in all of 2005.

Keeping with the tradition of the World Series of Poker, the WCOOP is a series of tournaments in which players compete in a variety of different poker games, each with different buy-in and prize levels. The games featured are Limit, Pot Limit and No Limit Texas Hold'em, Seven Card Stud and Seven Card Stud Hi/Lo, Razz, Pot Limit Omaha High and Limit Omaha Hi/Lo, and H.O.R.S.E. In 2007, 5 Card Draw and 2-7 Triple draw were added. 2-7 Single Draw and mixed limit games were added in 2008, and Badugi was added in 2009. The main event is No Limit Hold'em.

In addition to the cash prize, the winner of each WCOOP event received a personally engraved 14 karat gold bracelet from PokerStars up until 2015. Since then, PokerStars has discontinued awarding bracelets to save costs.

== WCOOP Player of the Series ==
Year	Country	Nickname	Name
2009	(United States)	djk123	Dan Kelly
2010	(Australia)	Andy McLEOD	James Obst
2011	(Spain)	2FLY2TILT	Joel Adam Gordon
2012	(Norway)	mikal12345	Mikal Blomlie
2013	(Norway)	Sykoen	Yngve Steen
2014	(United Kingdom)	Mr Negreanu	Alan Gold
2015	(Mexico)	shaundeeb	Shaun Deeb
2016	(Uruguay)	SixthSenSe19	Fabrizio Gonzalez
2017	(Russia)	ImluckNuts	Maksim Pisarenko
2018	(Russia)	aDrENalin710	Denis Strebkov
2019	(Finland)	calvin7v	Jussi Nevanlinna
2020	(Russia)	Zapahzamazki	Rinat Lyapin
2021	(United Kingdom)	raidalot	Talal Shakerchi
2022	(Brazil)	RuiNF	Rui Ferreira
2023	(United Kingdom)	pads1161	Patrick Leonard
2024	(Thailand)	FAL1st	
2025	(Albania)	king153246	

== WCOOP Main Event winners ==
Date	Event	Winner	Prize	Entries	Prize pool
Jul 28, 2002	$1,050 No Limit Texas Hold'em Main Event	(Sweden) MultiMarine	$65,450.00	238	$238,000.00
Aug 17, 2003	$1,050 No Limit Texas Hold'em Main Event	(United States) DeOhGee (Joseph Cordi)	$222,750.00	891	$891,000.00
Aug 8, 2004	$2,600 No Limit Texas Hold'em Main Event	(Norway) Ragde (Edgar Skjervold)	$424,945.26	843	$2,104,500.00
Sep 18, 2005	$2,600 No Limit Texas Hold'em Main Event	(United States) Panella86 (Jordan Berkowitz)	$577,342.00	1,494	$3,735,000.00
Oct 1, 2006	$2,600 No Limit Texas Hold'em Main Event	(United States) area23JC (J. C. Tran)	$670,194.00	2,510	$6,275,000.00
Sep 30, 2007	$2,600 No-Limit Hold'em Main Event	(United States) ka$ino1 (Kyle Schroeder)	$1,378,330.50	2,998	$7,495,000.00
Sep 21, 2008	$5,200 No-Limit Hold'em Main Event	(United States) ckingusc (Carter King)	$1,265,432.23	2,185	$10,925,000.00
Sep 20, 2009	$5,200 No Limit Hold'em Main Event	(United States) Jovial Gent (Yevgeniy Timoshenko)	$1,715,200.00	2,144	$10,720,000.00
Sep 26, 2010	$5,200 No-Limit Hold'em [Main Event]	(United States) POTTERPOKER (Tyson Marks)	$2,278,097.50	2,443	$12,215,000.00
Sep 25, 2011	$5,200 No-Limit Hold'em [Main Event]	(Denmark) Kallllle (Thomas Pedersen)	$1,260,018.50	1,627	$8,135,000.00
Sep 23, 2012	$5,200 No-Limit Hold'em [Main Event]	(Russia) maratik (Marat Sharafutdinov)	$1,000,907.26	1,825	$9,125,000.00
Sep 29, 2013	$5,200 NL Hold'em Main Event	(Germany) PlayinWasted (David Kaufmann)	$1,493,499.15	2,133	$10,665,000.00
Sep 28, 2014	$5,200 NL Hold'em Main Event	(Austria) CrownUpGuy (Fedor Holz)	$1,300,000.00	2,142	$10,710,000.00
Sep 27, 2015	$5,200 NL Hold'em Main Event	(Belgium) Coenaldinho7 (Kristof Coenen)	$1,300,000.00	1,995	$10,000,000.00
Sep 25, 2016	$5,000 NL Hold'em Main Event	(Germany) llJaYJaYll (Jonas Lauck)	$1,517,541.25	2,091	$10,052,879.79
Sep 24, 2017	$5,200 NLHE [Main Event]	(Netherlands) SvZff (Steven van Zadelhoff)	$1,624,502.27	2,183	$10,915,000.00
Sep 16, 2018	$5,200 NLHE [Main Event]	(Argentina) eze88888 (Ezequiel Waigel)	$1,529,000.00	2,044	$10,220,000.00
Sep 22, 2019	$5,200 NLHE [Main Event]	(United Kingdom) BigBlindBets (Charles Russell)	$1,665,962.04	2,236	$11,180,000.00
Sep 20, 2020	$5,200 NLHE [Main Event]	(Portugal) PTFisherman23 (Andre Marques)	$1,147,270.86	1,977	$10,000,000.00
Sep 12, 2021	$5,200 NLHE [Main Event]	(Russia) CrazyLissy	$1,499,942.00	1,965	$10,000,000.00
Sep 25, 2022	$10,300 NLHE [Main Event]	(Portugal) luis_faria (Luis Faria)	$1,293,825.00	760	$7,600,000.00
Oct 01, 2023	$10,300 NLHE [Main Event]	(United Kingdom) ILS007 (Ivan Stokes)	$1,047,257.00	600	$6,000,000.00
Sep 29, 2024	$10,300 NLHE [Main Event]	(Finland) €urop€an (Samuel Vousden)	$1,007,058.00	502	$5,020,000.00
Sep 28, 2025	$10,300 NLHE [Main Event]	(Netherlands) TaxationIsTheft (Gilles Simon)	$736,327.00	407	$4,070,000.00

== WCOOP multiple event winners ==
Country	Nickname	Name	L	M	H	Total
(United Kingdom)	RunGodlike	Benny Glaser	2	5	9	16
(Russia) (Thailand)	aDrENalin710	Denis Strebkov	2	4	8	14
(Portugal) (United Kingdom)	Naza114	Joao Vieira	-	1	12	13
(United Kingdom)	pads1161	Patrick Leonard	-	3	10	13
(Norway)	Senkel92	Tobias Leknes	3	4	6	13
(Sweden)	Lena900	Niklas Astedt	-	2	10	12
(Russia) (Thailand)	FAL1st	Unknown	-	3	8	11
(Brazil)	Internett93o	Renan Bruschi	-	2	7	9
(Brazil)	theNERDguy	Yuri Martins Dzivielevski	-	1	8	9
(Canada)	tonkaaaa	Parker Talbot	-	1	8	9
(Portugal) (Brazil)	RuiNF	Rui Neves Ferreira	2	2	4	8
(United States) (Mexico)	shaundeeb	Shaun Deeb	-	1	7	8
(Russia) (Mexico)	Ti0373	Gleb Tremzin	-	3	5	8
(Poland) (Latvia)	Colisea	Dzmitry Urbanovich	-	1	6	7
(Spain) (Andorra)	Malaka$tyle	Juan Pardo Domínguez	-	3	4	7
(Sweden)	Perrymejsen	Jerry Ödeen	1	3	3	7
(Hungary)	probirs	Andras Nemeth	-	1	6	7
(United Kingdom)	raidalot	Talal Shakerchi	-	1	6	7
(Canada)	roo_400	François Billard	-	1	6	7
(Finland)	€urop€an	Samuel Vousden	-	-	6	6
(Finland)	calvin7v	Jussi Nevanlinna	1	2	3	6
(Denmark)	CMoosepower	Christian Elgstrøm	-	2	4	6
(Bulgaria)	cocojamb0	Ognyan Dimov	-	2	4	6
(Belarus)	Leqenden	Ilya Anatskiy	-	1	5	6
(Slovenia)	Scarmak3r	Blaž Žerjav	-	2	4	6
(Spain) (United Kingdom)	Amadi_017	Adrián Mateos	-	1	4	5
(United States) (Mexico)	blanconegro	Connor Drinan	-	-	5	5
(United Kingdom)	BowieEffect	Andy Wilson	-	1	4	5
(United States) (Australia)	djk123	Dan Kelly	-	-	5	5
(Russia) (Bosnia and Herzegovina)	FONBET_RULIT	Unknown	-	3	2	5
(Russia)	Kroko-dill	Andrey Zaichenko	-	-	5	5
(Canada)	ISmellToast	Adam Crawford	2	1	2	5
(Germany)	nilsef	Unknown	1	-	5	5
(Russia) (Bosnia and Herzegovina)	Premove	Unknown	1	1	3	5
(United Kingdom) (Mexico)	SerVlaMin	Vladimir Minko	-	1	4	5
(Russia) (Albania)	king153246	Unknown	1	-	3	4
-	-	-	-	-	-	-
-	Results below is up	to WCOOP 2018	-	-	-	-
-	-	-	-	-	-	-
(Netherlands)	Exclusive	Noah Boeken	-	2	2	4
(Norway)	Donald	Anders Berg	-	-	3	3
(United States)	g0lfa	Ryan D'Angelo	-	-	3	3
(Belgium) (United Kingdom)	girafganger7	Bert Stevens	-	1	2	3
(Canada)	goleafsgoeh	Mike Leah	-	-	3	3
(Brazil)	Kovalski1	Fabiano Kovalski	-	-	3	3
(Norway)	mikal12345	Mikal Blomlie	-	-	3	3
(Brazil)	Muka82	Unknown	-	3	-	3
(Sweden)	murvl	Unknown	2	-	1	3
(Germany)	Fresh_oO_D	Jens Lakemeier	-	1	2	3
(Canada)	pistons87	Ankush Mandavia	-	-	3	3
(Canada)	prepstyle71	Patrick Serda	-	1	2	3
(Brazil)	Zagazaur	Filipe Oliveira	-	1	2	3
(Russia)	Zapahzamazki	Rinat Lyapin	-	3	-	3
(Belgium)	merla888	Michael Gathy	-	-	3	3
(United Kingdom)	rickv17	unknown	-	2	1	3
(Russia)	WTFOMFGOAO	Unknown	1	-	2	3
(Spain)	2FLY2TILT	Joel Adam Gordon	-	-	2	2
(United Kingdom)	Aggro Santos	Scott Margereson	-	-	2	2
(Poland)	__akun333___	Unknown	-	-	2	2
(Norway)	Assad91	Unknown	-	-	2	2
(Sweden)	bajskorven87	Unknown	-	-	2	2
(Mexico)	bob43155	Unknown	-	-	2	2
(Brazil)	botteonpoker	Unknown	-	-	2	2
(Costa Rica)	brianm15	Brian England	-	-	2	2
(Netherlands)	Brryann	Bryan Ruiter	-	-	2	2
(United States) (Mexico)	cal42688	Calvin Anderson	-	-	2	2
(Sweden)	compris	Unknown	-	-	2	2
(United Kingdom)	CrabMaki	David Shallow	-	-	2	2
(Brazil)	dantegoyaF	Unknown	1	-	1	2
(Canada)	darrenelias	Darren Elias	-	-	2	2
(Bulgaria)	Darreta	Unknown	-	-	2	2
(United Kingdom)	deivid29	Unknown	-	-	2	2
(Germany)	DSmunichlife	Unknown	-	1	1	2
(Sweden)	eisenhower1	Christian Jeppsson	-	-	2	2
(France)	ElkY	Bertrand Grospellier	-	-	2	2
(Finland)	Erä_Koira	Olli Ikonen	-	1	1	2
(Germany)	Face333X	Martin Schleich	-	1	1	2
(Russia)	Flying Smile	Dmitry Grinenko	-	1	1	2
(Canada)	FU_15	Unknown	-	-	2	2
(Canada)	G's zee	Shyam Srinivasan	-	-	2	2
(United Kingdom)	geokrinikali	Unknown	-	2	-	2
(Austria) (Germany)	GeorgeDanzer	George Danzer	-	-	2	2
(Brazil)	great dant	Bruno Volkmann	-	-	2	2
(Poland)	gregor7878	Grzegorz Wyraz	-	-	2	2
(Brazil)	GStronda	Gillian Conrado	1	1	-	2
(Canada)	hummylun	Jerry Wong	-	-	2	2
(Finland)	I_Mr_U_Bean	Henri Koivisto	-	-	2	2
(United States) (United Kingdom)	iacog4	Kevin Iacofano	-	1	1	2
(United States) (Canada)	Iftarii	Jonathan Jaffe	-	-	2	2
(Costa Rica)	ImDaNuts	Chris Oliver	-	1	1	2
(United States) (Canada)	JasonMercier	Jason Mercier	-	-	2	2
(Canada)	jbrown8777	Joel Brown	-	-	2	2
(Taiwan)	joe1224	Unknown	1	-	1	2
(Russia) (United Kingdom)	josef_shvejk	Unknown	-	-	2	2
(Finland)	kiiski	Jani Vilmunen	-	-	2	2
(United States)	kwob20	Kyle Bowker	-	-	2	2
(Georgia (country))	labirint93	Unknown	2	-	-	2
(Germany)	lissi stinkt	Christopher Frank	-	-	2	2
(United Kingdom)	ludovi333	Ludovic Geilich	-	-	2	2
(Netherlands) (Germany)	maggess88	Unknown	-	-	2	2
(Estonia)	markovitsus	Unknown	1	-	1	2
(Finland)	miikka84	Unknown	1	-	1	2
(Brazil) (France)	MiPwnYa	Quentin Lae	-	-	2	2
(Russia)	MiracleQ	Unknown	-	1	1	2
(Cyprus) (Netherlands)	MITS 304	Unknown	-	-	2	2
(Russia)	Mordnilap	Unknown	-	-	2	2
(United States) (Ukraine)	MyRabbiFoo / E. Katchalov	Eugene Katchalov	-	-	2	2
(Russia)	nafnaf_funny	Unknown	-	-	2	2
(Russia)	NikolasDLP	Nikolay Prokhorskiy	-	-	2	2
(Japan)	nkeyno	Unknown	-	-	2	2
(Mexico)	NoraFlum	Marco Johnson	-	-	2	2
(Lithuania)	NoTilit	Unknown	-	1	1	2
(Hungary)	omaha4rollz	Laszlo Bujtas	-	-	2	2
(Netherlands)	onmybicycle	Unknown	-	-	2	2
(Austria)	OverTheTop43	Jan Schwippert	-	-	2	2
(Chile)	oyarzun2010	Unknown	2	-	-	2
(Russia)	papan9_p$	Unknown	-	-	2	2
(Netherlands)	Pappe_Ruk	Joep van den Bijgaart	-	-	2	2
(Belarus)	Philych_085	Unknown	1	-	1	2
(Poland)	phounderAA	Unknown	-	2	-	2
(Mexico)	plattsburgh	Matt Vengrin	-	-	2	2
(Ukraine)	plspaythxbye	Unknown	-	-	2	2
(United Kingdom)	prebz	Preben Stokkan	-	-	2	2
(Brazil)	pycadasgalax	Unknown	-	2	-	2
(United Kingdom)	Roche9797	Unknown	-	1	1	2
(Brazil)	RRagazzo	Unknown	-	-	2	2
(Austria)	Schildy1984	Alexander Debus	-	1	1	2
(Finland)	serkku21	Unknown	-	2	-	2
(Netherlands)	silskyer	Unknown	-	1	1	2
(Canada)	SirWatts	Mike Watson	-	1	1	2
(Uruguay)	SixthSenSe19	Fabrizio Gonzalez	-	-	2	2
(United Kingdom)	SkaiWalkurrr	Rachid Ben Cherif	-	-	2	2
(Canada)	spawng	Unknown	-	-	2	2
(United States)	spencerman3	Unknown	-	-	2	2
(Mexico)	sprocketsAA	Unknown	-	1	1	2
(United States)	spencerman3	Unknown	-	-	2	2
(Bulgaria)	stilchuka	Unknown	2	-	-	2
(Canada)	Str8$$$Homey	Sam Greenwood	-	1	1	2
(Austria)	Tankanza	Gianluca Speranza	-	-	2	2
(Brazil)	teruliro	Guilherme Beavis	-	1	1	2
(Finland)	texasilainen	Unknown	1	1	-	2
(Ukraine)	The_Truht	Unknown	-	2	-	2
(United Kingdom)	thehushpuppy	Unknown	-	-	2	2
(Germany)	URMYLeNoR	Unknown	1	1	-	2
(Russia)	veeea	Artem Vezhenkov	-	-	2	2
(Finland)	villepn	Unknown	1	-	1	2
(Germany)	Wall131TCI-I	Unknown	-	2	-	2
(Sweden)	WhatIfGod	Unknown	-	-	2	2
(Hungary)	Wildace_hun	Unknown	-	-	2	2
(Canada)	woodbine ave	Unknown	-	-	2	2
(United States)	Xaston	Jaime Kaplan	-	-	2	2
(Switzerland) (Croatia)	Xungazz	Unknown	-	1	1	2
(Russia)	Yoo4	Kirill Shugai	-	-	2	2
(Netherlands)	TheCleaner11	Jorryt van Hoof	-	-	2	2

Up to Season 25 (2026)

== WCOOP bracelet winners by country (old) ==
Below is a breakdown of the login countries of all bracelet winners in the history of the WCOOP:

1. (United States) USA - 103
2. Canada - 80
3. Russia - 60
4. United Kingdom - 50
5. Mexico - 35
6. Sweden - 31
7. Norway - 24
8. Germany - 24
9. Netherlands - 23
10. Finland - 17
11. Australia - 17
12. Poland - 15
13. Denmark - 14
14. Austria - 12
15. Brazil - 12
16. Hungary - 11
17. Belgium - 8
18. Ukraine - 7
19. France - 7
20. Argentina - 7
21. Bulgaria - 6
22. Romania - 6
23. Costa Rica - 5
24. (Republic of Ireland) Ireland - 5
25. Czech Republic - 5
26. Greece - 4
27. Cyprus - 4
28. Malta - 3
29. Taiwan - 3
30. South Africa - 3
31. Philippines - 1
32. Slovenia - 1
33. Kazakhstan - 1
34. Bosnia and Herzegovina - 1
35. Uruguay - 1
36. Chile - 1
37. Croatia - 1
38. Armenia - 1

== 2002 events ==
The 2002 World Championship of Online Poker consisted of nine events with over $730,000 in combined prizes. The events, buy-ins, and winners are listed below.

Date	Event	Winner	Prize	Entries	Prize pool
Jul 20	$109 Limit Texas Hold'em	(United States) fingaz (Nik White)	$15,537.50	565	$56,600
Jul 21	$265 Pot Limit Omaha High Low	(Canada) Canuck	$14,231.25	207	$51,750
Jul 22	$265 Seven Card Stud High Low	(United States) 55lucky55 (Spiro Mitrokostas)	$14,025.00	204	$51,000
Jul 23	$320 No Limit Texas Hold'em	(United States) michigangirl	$23,677.50	287	$86,100
Jul 25	$320 Pot Limit Texas Hold'em	(France) MIK22 (Michel Abécassis)	$23,677.50	287	$86,100
Jul 26	$530 Limit Omaha High Low	(United States) –db- (Shae Drobushevich)	$20,250.00	135	$67,500
Jul 27	$530 Limit Texas Hold'em	(United States) kerrdawg	$37,537.50	273	$136,500
	$109 Limit Texas Hold'em Heads Up	(Sweden) lennart	$7,680.00	256	$25,600
Jul 28	$1,050 No Limit Texas Hold'em Main Event	(Sweden) MultiMarine	$65,450.00	238	$238,000

== 2003 events ==
The 2003 World Championship of Online Poker consisted of 11 events with a total prize pool of over $2.7 million. The events, buy-ins, and winners are listed below.

Date	Event	Winner	Prize	Entries	Prize pool
Aug 7	$109 No Limit Texas Hold'em Heads Up	(Netherlands) batoelrob (Rob Hollink)	$12,800.00	512	$51,200
Aug 8	$109 Limit Texas Hold'em	(United States) C.M. Burns	$32,525.00	1,301	$130,100
Aug 9	$320 Pot Limit Omaha High Low	(United States) Lenny (Dan Heimiller)	$27,600.00	368	$110,400
Aug 10	$320 No Limit Texas Hold'em	(Sweden) Erik123 (Erik Sagström)	$101,850.00	1,358	$407,400
Aug 11	$320 Seven Card Stud	(United States) naya	$23,512.50	285	$85,500
Aug 12	$530 Pot Limit Texas Hold'em	(United States) jr50	$68,250.00	546	$273,000
Aug 13	$530 Omaha High Low	(United States) starkitty	$39,750.00	318	$159,000
Aug 14	$530 Seven Card Stud High Low	(United States) RatPack	$38,912.50	283	$141,500
Aug 15	$530 Pot Limit Omaha	(United States) Big Cy	$38,500.00	308	$154,000
Aug 16	$530 Limit Texas Hold'em	(United States) actiondonkey (Jim Meehan)	$78,250.00	626	$313,000
Aug 17	$1,050 No Limit Texas Hold'em Main Event	(United States) DeOhGee (Joseph Cordi)	$222,750.00	891	$891,000

== 2004 events ==
The 2004 World Championship of Online Poker consisted of 12 events with a total prize pool of over $6 Million. The events, buy-ins, and winners are listed below.

Date	Event	Winner	Prize	Entries	Prize pool
Jul 28	$320 Pot Limit Omaha High Low	(United States) AustinKearns	$47,025.00	627	$188,100
Jul 29	$215 No Limit Texas Hold'em Match Play	(Sweden) tobiper	$40,960.00	1,024	$204,800
Jul 30	$215 Limit Texas Hold'em	(United States) obiwon	$58,512.00	1,272	$254,400
Jul 31	$215 No Limit Texas Hold'em with rebuys	(United States) dblgutshot (Greg Alston)	$109,033.00	1,389 (771 R, 755 A)	$583,000
Aug 1	$530 No Limit Texas Hold'em	(United States) Sporto623	$68,892.88	1,642	$821,000
Aug 2	$320 Seven Card Stud	(United States) CoolHandTony	$37,875.00	505	$151,500
Aug 3	$530 Pot Limit Texas Hold'em	(France) fabsoul (Fabrice Soulier)	$60,230.00	728	$364,000
Aug 4	$530 Limit Omaha High Low	(United States) Raptor19	$51,300.00	513	$256,500
Aug 5	$530 Seven Card Stud High Low	(United States) LBJ1	$56,750.00	454	$227,000
Aug 6	$530 Pot Limit Omaha	(United States) joelmick	$41,986.50	487	$243,500
Aug 7	$1,050 Limit Texas Hold'em	(United States) Mandelbrot	$62,296.87	601	$601,000
Aug 8	$2,600 No Limit Texas Hold'em Main Event	(Norway) Ragde (Edgar Skjervold)	$424,945.26	843	$2,104,500

== 2005 events ==
The 2005 World Championship of Online Poker consisted of 15 events with a total prize pool of over $12 Million. The events, buy-ins, and winners are listed below.

Date	Event	Winner	Prize	Entries	Prize pool
Sep 4	$530 No Limit Texas Hold'em	(United States) Snow Leopard	$306,200.00	3,062	$1,531,000
Sep 5	$215 Pot Limit Omaha with rebuys	(United States) MR32	$102,422.00	973 (935 R, 590 A)	$499,600
Sep 6	$215 No Limit Texas Hold'em match play	(United States) lmoneyBling	$35,720.00	1,024	$204,800
Sep 7	$215 Pot Limit Texas Hold'em short-handed	(United States) luckyfire4	$67,367.00	2,345	$469,000
Sep 8	$215 No Limit Texas Hold'em with rebuys	(United States) genoa_st	$187,166.00	2,146 (1,825 R, 1,235 A)	$1,041,200
Sep 9	$215 Limit Texas Hold'em	(United States) ActionJeff (Jeff Garza)	$50,000.00	1,781	$356,200
Sep 10	$520 Pot Limit Texas Hold'em	(Canada) kwil20	$114,000.00	1,185	$592,500
Sep 11	$1,050 No Limit Texas Hold'em	(United States) VikingVI	$316,638.00	1,790	$1,790,000
Sep 12	$320 Seven Card Stud	(Denmark) SUPERTYR	$35,733.00	622	$186,600
Sep 13	$1,050 No Limit Texas Hold'em Triple Shootout	(United States) Acey-Deucy	$150,026.00	635	$700,000
Sep 14	$530 Limit Omaha High Low	(United States) musher	$81,289.00	735	$367,500
Sep 15	$530 Seven Card Stud High Low	(United States) Bunsen (Matt Mortensen)	$66,125.00	529	$264,500
Sep 16	$530 Pot Limit Omaha	(Canada) spawng	$66,787.00	720	$360,000
Sep 17	$1,050 Limit Texas Hold'em	(United States) DietDrPoker	$139,799.00	686	$686,000
Sep 18	$2,600 No Limit Texas Hold'em Main Event	(United States) Panella86 (Jordan Berkowitz)	$577,342.00	1,494	$3,735,000

== 2006 events ==
The 2006 World Championship of Online Poker consisted of 18 events. The schedule including buy in for each event is listed below. 2006 WCOOP Total Prize Pool was $18,674,300

Date	Event	Winner	Prize	Entries	Prize pool	Elapsed time
Sep 16	$215 Razz	(United States) Nabokov	$58,365.00	1,297	$259,400	13 h 40 min
Sep 17	$530 No Limit Texas Hold'em	(Sweden) Rambo5	$320,865.00	4,495	$2,247,500	13 h 7 min
Sep 18	$320 Pot Limit Omaha with re-buys	(Sweden) thegiant	$151,260.90	773 (987 R, 501 A)	$678,300	12 h 53 min
Sep 19	$215 No Limit Texas Hold'em Match Play	(Canada) spawng^{1}	$58,248.00	2,048	$409,600	11 h 43 min
Sep 20	$530 Limit Omaha Hi-Lo	(United States) kwob20 (Kyle Bowker)	$103,162.25	953	$476,500	11 h 12 min
Sep 21	$215 No Limit Texas Hold'em with rebuys	(United States) austinlewis	$199,509.00	2,081 (2,503 R, 1,337 A)	$1,184,200	13 h 34 min
Sep 22	$215 Limit Texas Hold'em	(Canada) yaaaflow	$60,419.00	1,871	$374,400	12 h 29 min
Sep 23	$215 HORSE	(Germany) F.Briatore	$79,112.00	1,798	$359,600	13 h 14 min
Sep 23	$530 Pot Limit Texas Hold'em	(United States) uncforte	$105,329.00	1,095	$547,500	10 h 58 min
Sep 24	$1,050 No Limit Texas Hold'em	(United States) strassa2 (Jason Strasser)	$442,440.00	2,458	$2,458,000	13 h 48 min
Sep 25	$320 Seven Card Stud	(United States) nikstar	$39,548.00	657	$197,100	11 h 41 min
Sep 26	$320 Pot Limit Omaha Hi-Lo	(United States) Mr. Shhhhhhh	$56,080.00	1,303	$390,900	12 h 50 min
Sep 27	$320 Pot Limit Texas Hold'em Short-handed (6/table)	(United States) dnKid	$87,560.00	1,741	$522,300	12 h 2 min
Sep 28	$530 Seven Card Stud Hi-Lo	(United States) kwob20² (Kyle Bowker)	$68,267.50	581	$290,500	11 h 44 min
Sep 29	$530 Pot Limit Omaha	(Finland) Trabelsi	$93,852.75	867	$433,500	10 h 45 min
Sep 30	$5,200 HORSE	(United States) stelladora (Chad Brown)	$223,150.00	175	$875,000	11 h 21 min
Sep 30	$1,050 Limit Texas Hold'em	(Hungary) laurentia	$145,200.00	695	$695,000	11 h 51 min
Oct 1	$2,600 No Limit Texas Hold'em Main Event	(United States) area23JC (J. C. Tran)	$670,194.00³	2,510	$6,275,000	13 h 33 min

^{1}spawng becomes first player to win 2 WCOOP Bracelets.
²kwob20 becomes first player to win 2 WCOOP bracelets in one year
³The original first prize was to be $1,157,737.50, but the final six players in the tournament struck a deal to more evenly divide the prize money.

== 2007 events ==
The 2007 World Championship of Online Poker consists of 23 events. The schedule including buy in for each event is listed below. 2007 WCOOP Total Prize Pool was $24,218,600

The event was marred by controversy when the original winner of the main event, TheV0id was disqualified for using multiple accounts in the tournament following an investigation by PokerStars.

Date	Event	Winner	Prize	Entries	Prize pool	Elapsed time
Sep 14	$215 No-Limit Hold'em [6-max]	(United States) samh133	$155,560.73	4,610	$922,000	16 h 46 min
Sep 14	$215 Pot-Limit 5-Card Draw	(Austria) spielraum.at (Florian Oberauer)	$26,265.54	857	$171,400	14 h 23 min
Sep 15	$215 Pot-Limit Omaha [6-max]	(Sweden) jalla79	$67,739.58	1,818	$363,600	13 h 43 min
Sep 15	$215 2-7 Triple Draw	(Norway) Donald (Anders Berg)	$32,450.00	649	$129,800	13 h 0 min
Sep 16	$530 No-Limit Hold'em	(Denmark) AB_illusive (Asger Boye)	$398,649.93	6,025	$3,012,500	20 h 38 min
Sep 17	$320 Pot-Limit Omaha w/Rebuys	(United States) FossilMan (Greg Raymer)	$168,362.40	772 (1,062 R, 544 A)	$713,400	16 h 11 min
Sep 18	$215 Limit Hold'em	(United States) Cardinal7	$67,933.49	2,059	$411,800	16 h 10 min
Sep 19	$530 Limit Omaha H/L (8 or better)	(Austria) copi (Bernd Stadlbauer)	$87,882.76	917	$458,500	13 h 58 min
Sep 20	$215 No-Limit Hold'em w/Rebuys	(Sweden) ruthan	$198,125.66	2,188 (2,852 R, 1,574 A)	$1,322.800	18 h 22 min
Sep 21	$320 No-Limit Hold'em Match Play	(Sweden) ugotmeyet?	$82,054.00	1,886	$565,800	16 h 2 min
Sep 21	$215 Razz	(United States) OnlyPlayRagz	$41,136.79	1,176	$235,200	13 h 47 min
Sep 22	$215 H.O.R.S.E.	(Netherlands) jaliks	$72,116.00	1,639	$327,800	16 h 46 min
Sep 22	$530 Pot-Limit Hold'Em	(Sweden) antroff	$117,175.00	1,090	$545,000	14 h 36 min
Sep 23	$1,050 No-Limit Hold'em	(United States) mig.com (James Mackey)	$580,212.50	3,325	$3,325,000	18 h 24 min
Sep 24	$320 7-Card Stud	(Republic of Ireland) Ubsolute	$25,000.00	696	$208,800	13 h 34 min
Sep 25	$320 Pot-Limit Omaha H/L (8 or better)	(United States) tiger76 (Raja Kattmuri)	$61,419.17	1,536	$460,800	13 h 41 min
Sep 26	$320 No-Limit Hold'em [6-max]	(Germany) pes4fans	$167,553.36	2,873	$861,900	17 h 33 min
Sep 27	$530 7-Card Stud H/L (8 or better)	(United States) BigLL	$48,367.32	598	$299,000	13 h 26 min
Sep 28	$530 Pot-Limit Omaha	(Canada) buck21 (Shawn Buchanan)	$97,262.78	1,046	$523,000	10 h 46 min
Sep 28	$530 No-Limit Hold'em Triple Shootout	(United States) lyerly_ (Sean Timney)	$76,545.00	729	$364,500	14 h 22 min
Sep 29	$5,200 H.O.R.S.E.	(Denmark) hairos (Jan V. Sørensen)	$202,921.00	177	$885,000	13 h 57 min
Sep 29	$1,050 Limit Hold'em	(United States) Sowerss (Mike Sowers)	$120,184.95	616	$616,000	15 h 35 min
Sep 30	$2,600 No-Limit Hold'em Main Event	(United States) ka$ino^{1} (Chris Lee #2)	$1,378,330.50	2,998	$7,495,000	21 h 51 min

^{1}Original winner, Mark 'TheV0id' Teltscher, disqualified.

== 2008 events ==
There were 33 events played in the September 2008 WCOOP. Each day of the 2008 WCOOP featured two events.

Date	Event #	Event	Winner	Prize	Entries	Prize pool	Elapsed time
Sep 5	1	$215 No-Limit Hold'em [6-max]	(United Kingdom) shane147 (Shane Hellyer)	$200,856.66	7,217	$1,443,400	17 h 38 min
Sep 5	2	$215 Pot-Limit 5-Card Draw^{1}	(United States) ImBillMcNeal	$34,201.60	1,024	$204,800	15 h 15 min
Sep 6	3	$215 Limit Hold'em	(United States) cwp394 (Matthew Ross)	$73,385.00	2,258	$451,600	17 h 46 min
Sep 6	4	$215 2-7 Triple Draw	(Norway) playitsafe	$24,809.20	734	$146,800	14 h 41 min
Sep 7	5	$10,300 No-Limit Hold'em	(United States) dorinvandy (Scott Dorin)	$617,925.00	321	$3,210,000	14 h 18 min
Sep 7-Sep 8	6	$530 No-Limit Hold'em	(United States) Calvin32 (Tim Sullivan)	$452,086.50	7,351	$3,675,500	
Sep 8	7	$215 Pot-Limit Omaha [6-max]	(United States) Mary 717	$71,730.20	2,457	$491,400	16 h 06 min
Sep 8	8	$320 8-game Mixed Event	(Canada) Ulett_23	$50,797.28	1,128	$338,400	13 h 34 min
Sep 9	9	$215 No-Limit Hold'em [4-max]	(Norway) jonasof87 (Jonas Helness)	$95,410.00	3,290	$658,000	15 h 46 min
Sep 9	10	$215 Razz	(Canada) dinho_style	$43,096.48	1,288	$257,600	16 h 17 min
Sep 10	11	$320 Pot-Limit Omaha Hi/Lo	(United States) 92848 (Brent Carter)	$88,383.00	1,733	$519,900	17 h 26 min
Sep 10	12	$320 Mixed Hold'em [6-max]	(United States) Randers (Randy Haddox)	$66,000.00	1,496	$448,800	17 h 6 min
Sep 11	13	$215 No-Limit Hold'em w/Rebuys	(Sweden) lrdvoldemort	$207,772.50	2,234 (2,635 R, 1,524 A)	$1,278,600	17 h 36 min
Sep 11	14	$320 Seven-Card Stud	(United States) Mildred53	$28,608.50	627	$188,100	14 h 20 min
Sep 12	15	$320 Heads-Up No-Limit Hold'em	(Sweden) Huxfluxen	$89,744.00	2,048	$614,400	15 h 11 min
Sep 12	16	$215 Pot-Limit Omaha [1 Rebuy/1 Add-on]	(Australia) Andy McLEOD (James Obst)	$98,280.00	1,223 (756 R, 751 A)	$546,000	15 h 7 min
Sep 13	17	$530 Pot-Limit Hold'em [6-max]	(United States) poker1O1	$80,400.00	960	$480,000	14 h 39 min
Sep 13	18	$215 H.O.R.S.E	(United States) Sensor	$57,421.66	2,091	$418,200	16 h 45 min
Sep 14	19	$25,500 Heads-Up No-Limit Hold'em	(United States) stevesbets (Steven Jacobs)	$560,000.00	64	$1,600,000	9 h 48 min
Sep 14-Sep 15	20	$1,050 No-Limit Hold'em	(United States) NYC P.I.M.P (Mike Shklover)	$257,953.38	3,467	$3,467,000	
Sep 15	21	$530 Seven-Card Stud Hi/Lo	(United States) weaktight (Mark Gregorich)	$42,735.78	525	$262,500	15 h 37 min
Sep 15	22	$530 Mixed Omaha Hi/Lo [6-max]	(United States) BUCKIZ6	$55,800.00	620	$310,000	15 h 4 min
Sep 16	23	$530 No-Limit Hold'em [1 Rebuy/1 Add-on]	(United States) ddrufnek	$194,902.00	1,159 (807 R, 954 A)	$1,460,000	17 h 44 min
Sep 16	24	$530 No-Limit 2-7 Single Draw	(United States) luvgamble (Tom Schneider)	$42,000.00	308	$200,000	12 h 56 min
Sep 17	25	$320 Pot-Limit Omaha w/Rebuys	(United States) shaundeeb (Shaun Deeb)	$144,112.50	748 (1,254 R, 560 A)	$768,800	16 h 30 min
Sep 17	26	$320 No-Limit Hold'em [6-max]	(Netherlands) rubenrtv (Ruben Visser)	$135,687.64	3,273	$981,900	16 h 5 min
Sep 18	27	$530 No-Limit Hold'em Triple Shootout	(United States) TheActionKid (Andrew Glogowski)	$76,545.00	729	$364,500	15 h 47 min
Sep 18	28	$530 Limit Omaha Hi/Lo	(Canada) Big10	$69,801.88	829	$414,500	17 h 9 min
Sep 19	29	$530 No-Limit Hold'em w/Rebuys [6-max]	(United States) PiKappRaider (Steven Burkholder)	$211,133.76	852 (1,011 R, 658 A)	$1,260,500	16 h 9 min
Sep 19	30	$1,050 Pot-Limit Omaha	(Israel) salamandra24	$97,291.28	742	$742,000	14 h 31 min
Sep 20	31	$1,050 Limit Hold'em [6-max]	(United States) aasezz	$107,300.00	580	$580,000	16 h 32 min
Sep 20	32	$10,300 H.O.R.S.E	(United States) DocHolatchya	$287,500.00	125	$1,250,000	12 h 11 min
Sep 21-Sep 22	33	$5,200 No-Limit Hold'em Main Event^{2}	(United States) ckingusc (Carter King)	$1,265,432.23	2,185	$10,925,000	18 h 31 min

^{1}This event uses the same blind structure on the previous event (No Limit Hold'em)
^{2} the player known as "liberace" who was the runner-up of the $5,200 No-Limit Hold'em Main Event, won more than the winner due to an earlier chop while five handed of $1,375,249

== 2009 events ==
There were 45 events in the 2009 WCOOP, including Badugi, big antes No Limit Hold'em, and some new formats. A total of 43,973 unique players in 140 countries participated, making a total prize pool of $51,652,800.

Date	Time (ET)	Event #	Event	Winner	Prize	Entries	Prize pool	Elapsed time
Sep 3	14:30	1	$215 No Limit Hold'em [6-max]	(Finland) ChopSueyyy (Kaapo Martinmäki)	$234,421.82	8,538	$1,707,600	18 h 49 min
Sep 3	16:30	2	$215 Razz	(United States) djk123 (Dan Kelly)	$53,410.01	1,526	$305,200	14 h 19 min
Sep 4	14:30	3	$215 Pot Limit Omaha [6-max]	(United Kingdom) MUSTAFABET (Matthew Ashton)	$86,247.01	2,738	$547,600	13 h 35 min
Sep 4	16:30	4	$215 No Limit 2-7 Single Draw w/Rebuys	(Spain) 2FLY2TILT (Joel Adam Gordon)	$42,000.00	336 (178 R, 227 A)	$200,000	15 h 7 min
Sep 4	20:00	5	$109 8-game Mixed Event	(United States) FireGoblin	$23,230.84	1,779	$177,900	6 h 42 min
Sep 5	12:45	6	$109 No Limit Hold'em^{1}	(Greece) vakAAttack	$183,334.81	15,675	$1,567,500	9 h 37 min
Sep 5	14:30	7	$215 Pot Limit 5 Card Draw	(Spain) CesarSPA	$33,500.00	844	$200,000	13 h 24 min
Sep 5	16:30	8	$215 Limit Hold'em	(United States) iacog4 (Kevin Iacofano)	$64,000.00	1,800	$400,000	13 h 15 min
Sep 6	13:00	9	$215 No Limit Hold'em	(Slovakia) ternoplayer	$303,876.31	11,131	$2,226,200	19 h 17 min
Sep 6	14:30	10	$10,300 No Limit Hold'em^{2}	(Sweden) Sumpas (Kristoffer Thorsson)	$611,455.00	299	$2,990,000	16 h 5 min
Sep 6	17:00	11	$530 No Limit Hold'em	(United States) hustla16	$446,533.73	6,219	$3,109,500	
Sep 7	14:30	12	$215 No Limit Hold'em [4-max]	(France) lebordelaii	$111,457.69	3,854	$770,800	14 h 8 min
Sep 7	16:30	13	$320 7 Card Stud	(United States) yhcaep	$33,814.50	668	$200,400	13 h 1 min
Sep 8	14:30	14	$320 Mixed Hold'em [6-max]	(United States) dangdokodang	$75,024.01	1,563	$468,900	13 h 56 min
Sep 8	16:30	15	$320 Limit Badugi	(United States) raydavis77 (Raymond Davis)	$19,912.00	376	$112,800	13 h 54 min
Sep 8	20:00	16	$1,050 No Limit Hold'em	(Brazil) XTheDecanoX (Thiago Nishijima)	$249,280.00	1,558	$1,558,000	14 h 34 min
Sep 9	14:30	17	$530 No Limit Hold'em Triple Shootout [10-max]	(United States) iCeVeNoM	$91,250.00	1,000	$500,000	15 h 32 min
Sep 9	16:30	18	$320 8-game Mixed Event	(United States) g0lfa (Ryan D'Angelo)	$50,250.00	999	$300,000	12 h 29 min
Sep 10	14:30	19	$320 Pot Limit Omaha [1 Rebuy/1 Add-on, 6-max]	(Germany) GeorgeDanzer (George Danzer)	$109,545.00	976 (575 R, 629 A)	$654,000	14 h 21 min
Sep 10	16:30	20	$320 2-7 Triple Draw	(United States) Timmy K	$26,676.00	468	$140,400	12 h 19 min
Sep 11	14:30	21	$215 No Limit Hold'em w/Rebuys	(Germany) Soterdelf	$174,594.68	2,780 (2,439 R, 1,765 A)	$1,396,800	17 h 57 min
Sep 11	16:30	22	$530 Limit Omaha H/L	(United Kingdom) Science	$54,139.58	840	$420,000	13 h 35 min
Sep 11	20:00	23	$320 No Limit Hold'em [10-minute Levels]	(Canada) Str8$$$Homey (Sam Greenwood)	$126,441.01	2,676	$802,800	8 h 44 min
Sep 12	14:45	24	$530 Heads-Up No Limit Hold'em	(United States) MyRabbiFoo (Eugene Katchalov)	$170,000.00	1,564	$1,000,000	21 h 33 min
Sep 12	16:30	25	$320 HORSE	(United States) todch	$70,400.00	1,180	$400,000	12 h 21 min
Sep 13	13:00	26	$215 No Limit Hold'em	(Netherlands) lelijk22	$274,260.00	9,795	$1,959,000	18 h 18 min
Sep 13	14:30	27	$25,500 Heads-Up No Limit Hold'em	(United States) Iftarii (Jonathan Jaffe)	$315,000.00	36	$900,000	11 h 44 min
Sep 13	17:00	28	$1,050 No Limit Hold'em	(United States) Unsyatisfied	$513,076.00	3,268	$3,268,000	
Sep 14	14:30	29	$320 Mixed [Pot Limit Hold'em, Omaha]	(United States) g0lfa (Ryan D'Angelo)	$69,245.51	1,407	$422,100	13 h 32 min
Sep 14	16:30	30	$320 No Limit Hold'em [2X Chance]	(United States) spencerman3	$131,819.41	2,488 (293 R)	$834,300	16 h 10 min
Sep 15	14:30	31	$320 Pot Limit Omaha w/Rebuys [6-max]	(Sweden) KRUTHE	$119,000.00	799 (933 R, 534 A)	$700,000	13 h 5 min
Sep 15	16:30	32	$530 7 Card Stud H/L	(United States) ShawnZJones	$47,940.00	510	$255,000	13 h 30 min
Sep 15	20:00	33	$1,050 No Limit Hold'em	(United States) df1986 (Darryll Fish)	$160,525.11	1,240	$1,240,000	14 h 18 min
Sep 16	14:30	34	$215 No Limit Hold'em [big antes]	(Germany) Koln4ever	$114,610.00	3,650	$730,000	16 h 9 min
Sep 16	16:30	35	$320 Pot Limit Omaha H/L	(United States) twenty305	$80,000.00	1,567	$500,000	13 h 42 min
Sep 17	14:30	36	$530 No Limit Hold'em w/Rebuys [6-max]	(United States) Astrolux85 (Brent Roberts)	$210,000.00	1,030 (1,000 R, 722 A)	$1,376,000	15 h 49 min
Sep 17	16:30	37	$2,100 Pot Limit Omaha [6-max]	(Finland) kiiski (Jani Vilmunen)	$172,140.00	453	$906,000	16 h 34 min
Sep 18	14:30	38	$530 No Limit Hold'em [1 Rebuy/1 Add-on]	(France) ElkY (Bertrand Grospellier)	$232,730.00	1,169 (742 R, 827 A)	$1,369,000	15 h 47 min
Sep 18	16:30	39	$1,050 Limit Hold'em [6-max]	(Canada) Unassigned (Terrence Chan)	$83,030.00	437	$437,000	11 h 38 min
Sep 18	20:00	40	$215 No Limit Omaha H/L	(United States) PiMaster (Chris Viox)	$42,263.65	1265	$253,000	8 h 4 min
Sep 19	14:30	41	$530 Heads-Up Pot Limit Omaha	(United States) robert07 (Justin Young)	$52,600.00	526	$263,000	20 h 42 min
Sep 19	16:30	42	$2,100 8-game Mixed Event	(United States) RugDoctor (David Williams)	$107,800.00	245	$409,000.00	14 h 57 min
Sep 20	13:00	43	$215 No Limit Hold'em	(France) ElkY (Bertrand Grospellier)	$263,323.20	9,220	$1,844,000	18 h 29 min
Sep 20	14:30	44	$10,300 HORSE	(United States) djk123 (Dan Kelly)	$252,350.00	103	$1,030,000	17 h 03 min
Sep 20	17:00	45	$5,200 No Limit Hold'em Main Event	(United States) Jovial Gent (Yevgeniy Timoshenko)	$1,715,200.00	2,144	$10,720,000	

^{1}Holds the record for the largest WCOOP field ever.
^{2}This event uses the 9x awards structure.

== 2010 events ==
There were 62 events in the 2010 WCOOP.

Date	Time (ET)	Event #	Event	Winner	Prize	Entries	Prize pool	Elapsed time
Sep 5	13:00	1	$215 No Limit Hold'em [6-max]	(Denmark) AlexKP (Alexander Petersen)	$257,000.00*	9,001	$1,800,200.00	18 h 26 min
Sep 5	15:00	2	$10,300 No Limit Hold’em [High Roller]	(United Kingdom) CrabMaki (David Shallow)	$605,655.00	313	$3,130,000.00	15 h 50 min
Sep 5	17:00	3	$215 No Limit Hold’em	(Brazil) joao bauer (João Divino Dorneles Neto)	$316,702.37*	12,066	$2,413,200.00	19 h 31 min
Sep 6	14:00	4	$320 Pot Limit Omaha	(Austria) ProXimaVez	$86,640.65	1,805	$541,500.00	10 h 5 min
Sep 6	17:00	5	$320 No Limit Hold’em Shootout [6-Max]	(Greece) J0hnny_Dr@m@	$62,208.36	1,296	$388,800.00	12 h 0 min
Sep 6	20:00	6	$215 No Limit Hold’em Turbo w/Rebuys	(United States) Xaston (Jaime Kaplan)	$213,986.82	1,667 (3818 R, 937 A)	$1,304,400.00	03 h 49 min
Sep 7	14:00	7	$215 Pot Limit 5 Card Draw	(Ukraine) Ig123456789	$22,648.00	596	$119,200.00	11 h 28 min
Sep 7	17:00	8	$215 Triple Stud	(Austria) Glucksi203	$29,550.00	788	$157,600.00	12 h 07 min
Sep 7	20:00	9	$1,050 No Limit Hold'em	(Russia) joiso (Alexander Kostritsyn)	$269,284.60	1,240	$1,612,000.00	
Sep 8	12:00	10	$265 Pot Limit Omaha [Knockout]	(Germany) nilsef	$50,015.50	1,493	$298,600.00	13 h 1 min
Sep 8	14:00	11	$320 No Limit Hold’em [Ante Up]	(Luxembourg) flashdisastr	$68,072.32*	1,789	$536,700.00	16 h 17 min
Sep 8	17:00	12	$215 No Limit Hold'em [Heads-Up]	(Brazil) IneedMassari (João Simão)	$78,438.00	2,307	$461,400.00	
Sep 9	12:00	13	$215 Pot Limit Omaha H/L [1 Rebuy/1 Add-on, 6-max]	(Russia) Kroko-dill (Andrey Zaichenko)	$63,080.14	831 (470 R, 488 A)	$357,800.00	13 h 32 min
Sep 9	14:00	14	$265 No Limit Hold’em [6-max] [Knockout]	(United States) knecht_poker (Kyle Knecht)	$104,737.50	3,325	$665,000.00	16 h 4 min
Sep 9	17:00	15	$215 Razz	(United States) TDT07	$41,787.50*	976	$250,000.00	13 h 42 min
Sep 10	14:00	16	$215 Pot Limit Omaha [6-max]	(Netherlands) de bluffer	$78,750.00	2,154	$500,000.00	14 h 39 min
Sep 10	17:00	17	$215 No Limit 2-7 Single Draw	(United States) cal42688 (Calvin Anderson)	$15,047.00	367	$73,400.00	10 h 24 min
Sep 10	20:00	18	$109 8-game [10-minute Levels]	(Germany) icatchyou	$18,871.91*	1,671	$167,100.00	06 h 19 min
Sep 11	13:00	19	$109 No Limit Hold’em [10-minute Levels]	(United States) DSchec	$175,000.00	11,085	$1,250,000.00	09 h 17 min
Sep 11	17:00	20	$215 Fixed Limit Hold’em	(United States) spencerman3	$42,500.00	1,238	$250,000.00	12 h 18 min
Sep 12	13:00	21	$215 No Limit Hold’em	(United States) Antoshka (Anton Smolyanskiey)	$280,000.00*	10,492	$2,098,400.00	18 h 21 min
Sep 12	17:00	22	$530 No Limit Hold’em	(Australia) kevinnok	$340,698.50*	5,799	$3,000,000.00	
Sep 13	14:00	23	$215 No Limit Hold’em [4-Max]	(United States) bcgt178	$71,000.00*	2,915	$700,000.00	16 h 17 min
Sep 13	17:00	24	$320 Seven Card Stud	(United States) MOJOEX1	$28,500.00	472	$150,000.00	11 h 55 min
Sep 13	20:00	25	$215 Pot Limit Omaha Turbo [1 Rebuy/1 Add-on]	(Belgium) enoezah	$87,085.36	1,107 (798 R, 586 A)	$498,200.00	04 h 12 min
Sep 14	14:00	26	$320 Mixed No Limit Hold’em [6-Max]	(United States) johnsonck69	$54,531.51*	1,116	$400,000.00	13 h 4 min
Sep 14	17:00	27	$320 Fixed Limit Badugi	(United States) jmonnett (John Monnette)	$19,250.00	322	$100,000.00	12 h 0 min
Sep 14	20:00	28	$1,050 No-Limit Hold’em	(United States) shaundeeb (Shaun Deeb)	$243,610.00	1,433	$1,433,000.00	
Sep 15	12:00	29	$265 No Limit Omaha Hi/Lo [Knockout]	(Australia) ROMES_HOME	$29,406.59*	990	$198,000.00	13 h 9 min
Sep 15	14:00	30	$530 No-Limit Hold'em Triple Shootout [10-Max]	(Russia) kardioloq	$91,250.00	895	$500,000.00	
Sep 15	17:00	31	$320 8-Game	(Netherlands) Brryann	$44,075.00	819	$250,000.00	11 h 55 min
Sep 16	12:00	32	$330 No Limit Hold’em [6-Max]	(Germany) 26071985 (Christoph Vogelsang)	$92,468.61	1,957	$587,100.00	14 h 15 min
Sep 16	14:00	33	$320 Pot-Limit Omaha [1 Rebuy/1 Add-on, 6-max]	(Bulgaria) Darreta	$96,259.80	811 (506 R, 503 A)	$546,000.00	14 h 00 min
Sep 16	17:00	34	$320 Fixed-Limit Triple Draw 2-7	(Norway) Donald (Anders Berg)	$25,890.30	446	$133,800.00	12 h 51 min
Sep 17	14:00	35	$215 No-Limit Hold'em w/Rebuys	(United States) Wretchy (Dan Martin)	$160,544.00	1,882(1,867 R) (1,268 A)	$1,003,400.00	15 h 20 min
Sep 17	17:00	36	$530 Fixed-Limit Omaha Hi/Lo	(United States) JP OSU (Jason Potter)	$75,200.00	641	$400,000.00	11 h 31 min
Sep 17	20:00	37	$320 No-Limit Hold’em [10-minute Levels]	(United States) ChipUniter	$110,614.08*	2,343	$750,000.00	08 h 49 min
Sep 18	13:00	38	$530 Heads-Up No Limit Hold'em	(Uruguay) SixthSenSe19 (Fabrizio Gonzalez)	$100,000.00*	943	$600,000.00	
Sep 18	17:00	40 (39 actually)	$320 HORSE	(United States) Trickey7	$55,500.00	858	$300,000.00	11 h 01 min
Sep 19	13:00	41 (40 actually)	$215 No Limit Hold’em	(Australia) Money_1985 (Oliver Speidel)	$282,798.80*	9,587	$1,917,400.00	19 h 23 min
Sep 19**	15:00	39 (41 actually)	$25,500 Heads-Up No Limit Hold'em [High-Roller]	(United States) RaiseOnce (Phil Ivey)	$348,750.00	31	$775,000.00	07 h 46 min
Sep 19	17:00	42	$1,050 No-Limit Hold’em	(United States) JasonMercier (Jason Mercier)	$435,862.07*	3,122	$3,122,000.00	
Sep 20	14:00	43	$320 Pot Limit Omaha w/Rebuys [6-max]	(United States) dapalma150 (Michael Palma)	$85,151.78*	759 (771 R, 529 A)	$617,700.00	13 h 49 min
Sep 20	17:00	44	$320 No-Limit Hold’em [2X Chance (1 Rebuy)]	(United States) mviper256	$120,000.00	1,989 (362 Rebuys)	$750,000.00	14 h 54 min
Sep 20	20:00	45	$265 No-Limit Hold’em [Turbo, Knockout]	(United States) JuneauJyack	$85,441.37*	2,987	$597,400.00	04 h 46 min
Sep 21	14:00	46	$320 Mixed [Pot Limit Hold'em, Omaha]	(Norway) FlyingSumo (Daniel Hersvik)	$64,000.00*	1,123	$400,000.00	13 h 24 min
Sep 21	17:00	47	$530 7 Card Stud H/L	(United States) Xaston (Jaime Kaplan)	$43,130.00	454	$227,000.00	11 h 41 min
Sep 21	20:00	48	$1,050 No Limit Hold'em	(United States) APowers1968 (Dan Colpoys)	$213,955.00	1,224	$1,224,000.00	
Sep 22	12:00	49	$215 No Limit Hold'em [1 Rebuy/1 Add-on]	(United States) dcg30	$123,628.08	1,654 (1,172R,942A)	$753,600.00	13 h 14 min
Sep 22	14:00	50	$215 No-Limit Hold’em [Big Antes]	(United States) Feltin'Donks (Joel Shulruf)	$91,000.00*	2,933	$600,000.00	15 h 56 min
Sep 22	17:00	51	$320 Pot Limit Omaha H/L	(United States) mustbetilt	$56,700.00*	1,282	$400,000.00	15 h 04 min
Sep 23	12:00	52	$320 No-Limit Hold’em [Turbo]	(United States) bbbbb33 (Joshua Weizer)	$114,192.72	2,379	$713,700.00	04 h 14 min
Sep 23	14:00	53	$530 No-Limit Hold'em w/Rebuys	(United States) DDBeast (Dustin Dorrance-Bowman)	$212,919.23*	873 (1,041 R) (637 A)	$1,257,500.00	15 h 20 min
Sep 23	17:00	54	$2,100 Pot Limit Omaha [6-max]	(United Kingdom) CHUFTY (Richard Ashby)	$185,760.00	480	$960,000.00	
Sep 24	14:00	55	$530 No Limit Hold'em [1 Rebuy/1 Add-on]	(United States) g0lfa (Ryan D'Angelo)^{1}	$199,450.35*	1,066 (746 R, 646 A)	$1,229,000.00	15 h 18 min
Sep 24	17:00	56	$1,050 Fixed Limit Hold'em [6-max]	(United States) croll103 (James Carroll)	$80,000.00	396	$400,000.00	10 h 24 min
Sep 24	20:00	57	$215 No-Limit Omaha H/L [10-minute Levels]	(Australia) aces_up4108	$36,833.01	1,161	$232,200.00	07 h 30 min
Sep 25	13:00	58	$530 Pot-Limit Omaha [Heads-Up]	(United States) Ifeedurfam	$49,670.00*	493	$246,500.00	
Sep 25	17:00	59	$2,100 HORSE	(Netherlands) TALLWASP( (Netherlands Antilles) )	$96,795.00	239	$478,000.00	
Sep 26	13:00	60	$215 No Limit Hold'em	(United States) Blue Knight1 (David Sesso)	$299,669.46*	11,733	$2,346,600.00	19 h 15 min
Sep 25	15:00	61	$10,300 8-game [High-Roller]	(Russia) Kravchenko (Alexander Kravchenko)	$345,800.00	133	$1,330,000.00	
Sep 26	17:00	62	$5,200 No-Limit Hold'em [Main Event]	(United States) POTTERPOKER (Tyson Marks)	$2,278,097.50^{2}	2,443	$12,215,000.00	

* next to the first place prize denotes a deal was made at the final table, original first place prizes are hidden and can be seen in edit mode
** This event was originally scheduled on one day before the date listed above and listed at event 39, but the order was changed so that events 40 and 41 were run before this one.
^{1}g0lfa (Ryan D'Angelo) becomes first player to win 3 WCOOP Bracelets.
^{2}Largest amount of money won in online poker history, 2010 Main Event (Tyson "POTTERPOKER" Marks)

== 2011 events ==
There were 62 events in the 2011 WCOOP. This was the first WCOOP series since Black Friday 2011, A legal action by the U.S. Government that forbids people living in the United States from playing poker for real money on the site due to banking regulations, as a result there are many current or former US citizens playing online from other countries the following list reflects as always the nations where the winners were logged-in at the time of the event.

Date	Time (ET)	Event #	Event	Winner	Prize	Entries	Prize pool	Elapsed time
Sep 4	10:00	1	$215 No Limit Hold'em [6-max]	(Belgium) LOL_U_91 (Miguel Use)	$211,000.00*	7,500	$1,500,000.00	[2-Day] event
Sep 4	12:00	2	$10,300 No Limit Hold’em [High Roller]	(United Kingdom) DYBYDX (Ashley Mason)	$430,000.00	200	$2,000,000.00	16 h 27 min
Sep 4	14:00	3	$215 No Limit Hold’em	(Russia) K_0_S_T_Y_A (Konstantin Uspenskiy)	$288,660.78	10,107	$2,021,400.00	[2-Day] event
Sep 5	11:00	4	$320 Pot Limit Omaha	(Australia) bratpack1979	$83,518.08	1,697	$509,100.00	15 h 20 min
Sep 5	14:00	5	$320 No Limit Hold’em Shootout [6-Max]	(United Kingdom) Mossop7	$62,208.36	1,296	$388,800.00	13 h 9 min
Sep 5	17:00	6	$215 No Limit Hold’em Turbo w/Rebuys	(Australia) MONSTER_DONG (Jonathan Karamalikis)	$179,569.13	1,589 (3130 R, 754 A)	$1,094,600.00	04 h 39 min
Sep 6	11:00	7	$215 Pot Limit 5 Card Draw	(Russia) ranayr	$19,608.00	516	$103,200.00	12 h 15 min
Sep 6	14:00	8	$215 Triple Stud	(Spain) 2FLY2TILT (Joel Adam Gordon)	$20,185.20	534	$106,800.00	11 h 07 min
Sep 6	17:00	9	$1,050 No Limit Hold'em	(Romania) extasyman (Andrei One)	$216,227.60	1,237	$1,237,000.00	[2-Day] event
Sep 7	6:00	10	$265 Pot Limit Omaha [Knockout]	(Finland) Olkku	$43,214.00	1,271	$254,200.00	13 h 7 min
Sep 7	11:00	11	$320 No Limit Hold’em [Ante Up]	(Lithuania) Ugnis	$73,717.02	1,467	$440,100.00	[2-Day] event
Sep 7	14:00	12	$215 No Limit Hold'em [Heads-Up]	(United Kingdom) rickv17	$75,616.00	2,224	$444,800.00	[2-Day] event
Sep 8	6:00	13	$215 Pot Limit Omaha H/L [1 Rebuy/1 Add-on, 6-max]	(United Kingdom) Pandochat	$42,408.00	558 (298 R, 260 A)	$223,200.00	14 h 20 min
Sep 8	11:00	14	$265 No Limit Hold’em [6-max] [Knockout]	(Russia) Tat0chka (Tatyana Ryzhkova)	$110,609.02	3,568	$713,600.00	[2-Day] event
Sep 8	14:00	15	$215 Razz	(Denmark) Fred_Brink (Frederik Brink Jensen)	$29,962.50	799	$159,800.00	13 h 16 min
Sep 09	11:00	16	$215 Pot Limit Omaha [6-max]	(Norway) Donald (Anders Berg)	$61,488.00	1,952	$390,400.00	14 h 48 min
Sep 09	14:00	17	$215 No Limit 2-7 Single Draw	(Netherlands) Brryann (Bryan Ruiter)	$16,380.00	390	$78,000.00	10 h 36 min
Sep 09	17:00	18	$320 No Limit Hold’em [10-minute Levels]	(Poland) N4kai	$107,515.78*	2,295	$688,500.00	08 h 05 min
Sep 10	10:00	19	$109 No Limit Hold’em	(Netherlands) erickie	$163,324.15	11,741	$1,174,100.00	17 h 52 min
Sep 10	14:00	20	$215 Fixed Limit Hold’em	(Norway) RiskStar	$35,244.00	979	$195,800.00	11 h 33 min
Sep 11	10:00	21	$215 No Limit Hold’em	(Poland) gregor7878 (Grzegorz Wyraz)	$158,627.33*	8,484	$1,696,800.00	[2-Day] event
Sep 11	14:00	22	$530 No Limit Hold’em	(Russia) Flying Smile (Dmitry Grinenko)	$293,512.31	3,739	$1,869,500.00	[2-Day] event
Sep 12	11:00	23	$215 No Limit Hold’em [4-Max]	(Sweden) z_balata (Gunnar Rabe)	$77,349.00	2,622	$524,400.00	[2-Day] event
Sep 12	14:00	24	$320 Seven Card Stud	(Canada) Big_Nemo	$19,461.91	337	$101,100.00	10 h 14 min
Sep 12	17:00	25	$215 Pot Limit Omaha Turbo [1 Rebuy/1 Add-on]	(Brazil) MiPwnYa (Quentin Lae)	$72,996.48	1,086 (756 R, 246 A)	$417,600.00	4 h 4 min
Sep 13	11:00	26	$320 Mixed Hold’em [6-Max]	(Netherlands) Exclusive (Noah Boeken)	$44,480.49	841	$252,300.00	11 h 40 min
Sep 13	14:00	27	$320 Fixed Limit Badugi	(Canada) goleafsgoeh (Mike Leah)	$17,082.00	292	$87,600.00	12 h 24 min
Sep 13	17:00	28	$1,050 No-Limit Hold’em	(Austria) Schildy1984 (Alexander Debus)	$206,280.00	1,146	$1,146,000.00	[2-Day] event
Sep 14	6:00	29	$265 No Limit Omaha Hi/Lo [Knockout]	(United Kingdom) Horns_Halos	$23,555.00*	685	$137,000.00	14 h 36 min
Sep 14	11:00	30	$530 No-Limit Hold'em Triple Shootout [10-Max]	(Poland) Olorionek (Jakub Michalak)	$54,814.20*	645	$322,856.70	[2-Day] event
Sep 14	14:00	31	$320 8-Game	(Netherlands) Vingtcent (Vincent Van Der Fluit)	$35,076.00	632	$189,600.00	11 h 5 min
Sep 15	6:00	32	$330 No Limit Hold’em [6-Max]	(Poland) sosickPL (Pawel Brzeski)	$78,000.00*	1,714	$514,200.00	[2-Day] event
Sep 15	11:00	33	$320 Pot-Limit Omaha [1 Rebuy/1 Add-on, 6-max]	(Russia) e1mdopp (Anatolii Ozhenilok)	$78,504.25*	706 (481 R, 346 A)	$459,900.00	13 h 11 min
Sep 15	14:00	34	$320 Fixed-Limit Triple Draw 2-7	(Canada) shaniac (Shane Schleger)	$21,771.00	354	$106,200.00	13 h 33 min
Sep 16	11:00	35	$215 No-Limit Hold'em w/Rebuys	(Russia) iwonthurtyou (Mikhail Glushankov)	$127,432.00	1,254(1,625 R) (869 A)	$749,600.00	14 h 29 min
Sep 16	14:00	36	$530 Fixed-Limit Omaha Hi/Lo	(Denmark) Mortholmes	$37,804.30	394	$197,000.00	10 h 53 min
Sep 16	17:00	37	$109 8-Game [10-minute Levels]	(Malta) djk123 (Dan Kelly)	$23,529.00	1,426	$142,600.00	6 h 23 min
Sep 17	10:00	38	$530 Heads-Up No Limit Hold'em	(Sweden) bajskorven87	$95,625.00	765	$382,500.00	[2-Day] event
Sep 17	14:00	39	$320 HORSE	(Canada) gboro780 (Steve Gross)	$33,332.52	591	$177,300.00	11 h 37 min
Sep 18	10:00	40	$215 No Limit Hold’em	(Russia) z81ima	$225,384.96*	8,332	$1,666,400.00	[2-Day] event
Sep 18	12:00	41	$10,300 Heads-Up No Limit Hold'em [High-Roller]	(Canada) pistons87 (Ankush Mandavia)	$119,000.00*	32	$320,000.00	8 h 36 min
Sep 18	14:00	42	$1,050 No-Limit Hold’em	(Cyprus) munchenHB (Michael Telker)	$353,120.00	2,207	$2,207,000.00	[2-Day] event
Sep 19	11:00	43	$320 Pot Limit Omaha w/Rebuys [6-max]	(United Kingdom) HonestPete	$102,543.00	593 (791 R, 415 A)	$539,700.00	13 h 39 min
Sep 19	14:00	44	$320 No-Limit Hold’em [2X Chance (1 Rebuy)]	(Netherlands) z0di@c	$129,840.80	2,080 (625 Rebuys)	$811,500.00	16 h 11 min
Sep 19	17:00	45	$265 No-Limit Hold’em [Turbo, Knockout]	(Russia) ChernyAV	$107,890.98	3,436	$687,200.00	04 h 20 min
Sep 20	11:00	46	$320 Mixed [Pot Limit Hold'em, Omaha]	(United Kingdom) Tim Piper	$45,795.67*	917	$275,100.00	12 h 18 min
Sep 20	14:00	47	$530 7 Card Stud H/L	(Colombia) marroca5 (Mayu Roca Uribe)	$25,545.00	262	$131,000.00	10 h 34 min
Sep 20	17:00	48	$1,050 No Limit Hold'em	(Mexico) jdtjpoker (Jason Wheeler)	$182,340.00	1,013	$1,013,000.00	[2-Day] event
Sep 21	6:00	49	$215 No Limit Hold'em [1 Rebuy/1 Add-on]	(United Arab Emirates) CASlNO ROYAL	$87,301.08	1,157 (754R,618A)	$505,800.00	14 h 46 min
Sep 21	11:00	50	$215 No-Limit Hold’em [Big Antes]	(Netherlands) PjotrNL	$78,496.00	2,453	$490,600.00	16 h 9 min
Sep 21	14:00	51	$320 Pot Limit Omaha H/L	(Finland) mnstrkll	$48,978.00	907	$272,100.00	12 h 20 min
Sep 22	6:00	52	$320 No-Limit Hold’em	(Greece) Demokritos09	$85,008.65	1,771	$531,300.00	15 h 17 min
Sep 22	11:00	53	$530 No-Limit Hold'em w/Rebuys	(Czech Republic) Vinkyy (Ondrej Vinklarek)	$160,558.13*	652 (753 R) (512 A)	$958,500.00	14 h 59 min
Sep 22	14:00	54	$2,100 Pot Limit Omaha [6-max]	(Lebanon) niccc (Nicolas Chouity)	$150,947.13*	418	$836,000.00	11 h 51 min
Sep 23	11:00	55	$530 No Limit Hold'em [1 Rebuy/1 Add-on]	(Canada) HR_Dub (Steve Williams)	$172,674.00	831 (562 R, 515 A)	$954,000.00	14 h 46 min
Sep 23	14:00	56	$1,050 Fixed Limit Hold'em [6-max]	(United Kingdom) ender555 (Joe Ebanks)	$62,480.00	284	$284,000.00	10 h 31 min
Sep 23	17:00	57	$215 No-Limit Omaha H/L [10-minute Levels]	(Russia) nemisoi	$31,002.65*	951	$190,200.00	07 h 48 min
Sep 24	10:00	58	$530 Pot-Limit Omaha [Heads-Up]	(Brazil) MiPwnYa (Quentin Lae)	$50,125.00	401	$200,500.00	[2-Day] event
Sep 24	14:00	59	$2,100 HORSE	(Norway) p3rc4 (Marcel Bjerkmann)	$61,335.00	141	$282,000.00	[2-Day] event
Sep 25	10:00	60	$215 No Limit Hold'em	(Netherlands) X-Front	$284,319.29	9,664	$1,932,800.00	[2-Day] event
Sep 25	12:00	61	$10,300 8-game [High-Roller]	(Russia) Ostrov	$210,000.00	70	$700,000.00	[2-Day] event
Sep 25	14:00	62	$5,200 No-Limit Hold'em [Main Event]	(Denmark) Kallllle (Thomas Pedersen)	$1,260,018.50*	1,627	$8,135,000.00	[2-Day] event

== 2012 events ==
There were 65 events in the 2012 WCOOP. The following list reflects, as always, the nations where the winners were logged-in at the time of the event.

Date	Time (ET)	Event #	Event	Winner	Prize	Entries	Prize pool	Elapsed time
Sep 2	11:00	1	$215 No Limit Hold'em [6-max]	(Argentina) ezepoker90	$184,388.82*	7,322	$1,464,400.00	[2-Day] event
Sep 2	14:30	2	$215 No Limit Hold'em	(Netherlands) ASIAAN	$231,221.20*	10,608	$2,121,600.00	[2-Day] event
Sep 3	11:00	3	$320 Pot Limit Omaha	(Sweden) utvekklo2	$65,717.00*	1,714	$514,200.00	13 h 47 min
Sep 3	14:00	4	$320 No Limit Hold’em Shootout [6-Max]	(Poland) Raaadzio91 (Radoslaw Morawiec)	$62,208.36	1,296	$388,800.00	13 h 14 min
Sep 3	17:00	5	$215 No Limit Hold'em Turbo w/Rebuys	(Mexico) RenRad 01 (Mark Darner)	$144,086.07*	1,807 (2834 R, 1,111 A)	$1,150,400.00	04 h 27 min
Sep 4	11:00	6	$215 Pot Limit 5 Card Draw	(Canada) 7PRS	$20,520.00	540	$108,000.00	12 h 30 min
Sep 4	14:00	7	$215 Triple Stud	(Austria) Falco234	$24,064.00	640	$128,000.00	12 h 22 min
Sep 4	17:00	8	$1,050 No Limit Hold'em	(United Kingdom) beardo1981	$262,936.70	1,574	$1,574,000.00	[2-Day] event
Sep 5	6:00	9	$265 Pot Limit Omaha [Knockout]	(Portugal) Anguilla	$40,595.52	1,176	$235,200.00	12 h 37 min
Sep 5	11:00	10	$320 No Limit Hold’em [Ante Up]	(Germany) GeorgeDanzer (George Danzer)	$69,717.09	1,367	$410,100.00	[2-Day] event
Sep 5	14:00	11	$215 No Limit Hold'em [Heads-Up]	(Canada) Stunnaf00	$58,634.00*	2,159	$431,800.00	[2-Day] event
Sep 6	6:00	12	$215 Pot Limit Omaha H/L [1 Rebuy/1 Add-on, 6-max]	(Norway) mikal12345 (Mikal Blomlie)	$43,396.00	555 (301 R, 286 A)	$228,400.00	13 h 3 min
Sep 6	11:00	13	$530 No Limit Hold’em [6-max] [Knockout]	(Belgium) Ajoin21	114,313.09*	1,938	$782,952.00	[2-Day] event
Sep 6	14:00	14	$215 7 Card Stud H/L	(Ukraine) E. Katchalov (Eugene Katchalov)	$24,588.70	655	$131,000.00	10 h 53 min
Sep 7	11:00	15	$215 Pot Limit Omaha [6-max]	(Mexico) cnew27 (Clayton Newman)	$51,391.18*	2,021	$404,200.00	13 h 14 min
Sep 7	14:00	16	$215 No Limit 2-7 Single Draw	(Cyprus) (RIP)C.McRae	$17,343.00	423	$84,600.00	11 h 40 min
Sep 7	17:00	17	$320 No Limit Hold’em [10-minute Levels]	(Germany) Umumba	90,659.14*	2,372	$711,600.00	08 h 19 min
Sep 8	11:00	18	$109 No Limit Hold’em	(Norway) Kodalite	$140,186.66*	9,959	$995,900.00	15 h 20 min
Sep 8	13:00	19	$320 No Limit Hold’em	(United Kingdom) danface	$132,436.00	2,794	$838,200.00	15 h 6 min
Sep 8	15:00	20	$215 Fixed Limit Hold’em	(Canada) dirty.brasil (Noah Vaillancourt)	$31,284.00	869	$173,800.00	11 h 36 min
Sep 9	11:00	21	$215 No Limit Hold’em	(Hungary) mrw8419	$164,619.33*	8,226	$1,645,200.00	[2-Day] event
Sep 9	12:30	22	$10,300 No Limit Hold’em [High Roller]	(Canada) darrenelias (Darren Elias)	$574,695.00	297	$2,970,000.00	[2-Day] event
Sep 9	14:30	23	$700 No Limit Hold’em	(Russia) hronik81 (Nikita Nikolaev)	$220,664.51*	3,215	$2,154,050.00	[2-Day] event
Sep 10	11:00	24	$215 No Limit Hold’em [4-Max]	(Austria) majus26	$81,015.74	2,784	$556,800.00	15 h 14 min
Sep 10	14:00	25	$320 Seven Card Stud	(Norway) osten (Thor Hansen)	$22,002.91	381	$114,300.00	10 h 1 min
Sep 10	17:00	26	$215 Pot Limit Omaha Turbo [1 Rebuy/1 Add-on]	(Norway) mikal12345 (Mikal Blomlie)	$83,158.68	1,223 (858 R, 328 A)	$481,800.00	4 h 6 min
Sep 11	11:00	27	$320 Mixed Hold’em	(Canada) putuonfbt	$40,296.60	732	$219,600.00	12 h 8 min
Sep 11	14:00	28	$320 Fixed Limit Badugi	(Canada) woodbine ave	$17,784.00	304	$91,200.00	12 h 25 min
Sep 11	17:00	29	$1,050 No-Limit Hold’em	(Costa Rica) Illini213 (Steve Barshak)	$225,490.00*	1,422	$1,422,000.00	[2-Day] event
Sep 12	6:00	30	$215 No Limit Hold’em [Ante Up]	(Germany) GermanBraine	38,141.36	1,091	$218,200.00	18 h 17 min
Sep 12	11:00	31	$530 No-Limit Hold'em Triple Shootout [10-Max]	(Republic of Ireland) da69kid	$64,879.20	711	$355,500.00	[2-Day] event
Sep 12	14:00	32	$320 8-Game	(Canada) shakentoucan	$36,600.38*	738	$221,400.00	11 h 50 min
Sep 13	6:00	33	$320 No Limit Hold’em [6-Max]	(United Kingdom) Bumbulbee_G	$80,291.61	1,647	$494,100.00	[2-Day] event
Sep 13	11:00	34	$320 Pot-Limit Omaha [1 Rebuy/1 Add-on, 6-max]	(Greece) ZISIMO7 (Georgios Zisimopoulos)	$97,952.28	860 (551 R, 441 A)	$555,600.00	13 h 09 min
Sep 13	14:00	35	$320 Fixed-Limit Triple Draw 2-7	(Sweden) erras	$22,683.20*	428	$128,400.00	12 h 6 min
Sep 14	11:00	36	$215 No-Limit Hold'em w/Rebuys	(Australia) djk123 (Dan Kelly)	$138,355.00	1,483(1,587 R) (1,060 A)	$826,000.00	15 h 36 min
Sep 14	14:00	37	$530 Fixed-Limit Omaha Hi/Lo	(Norway) inspecta	$41,162.55	429	$214,500.00	12 h 07 min
Sep 14	17:00	38	$215 PL Pre-Flop, NL Post-Flop Hold'em	(United Kingdom) 1UP_18	$43,282.00	1,273	$254,600.00	14 h 13 min
Sep 15	11:00	39	$700 Heads-Up No Limit Hold'em	(Russia) Ti0373 (Gleb Tremzin)	$120,600.00	720	$482,400.00	[2-Day] event
Sep 15	13:00	40	$320 No Limit Hold’em [6-Max]	(Romania) ottoman09	$86,771.85*	2,327	$698,100.00	16 h 15 min
Sep 15	15:00	41	$320 HORSE	(Mexico) NoraFlum (Marco Johnson)	$33,727.20	598	$179,400.00	11 h 12 min
Sep 16	11:00	42	$215 No-Limit Hold’em	(Denmark) OMG_POKISH	$250,264.40	8,342	$1,668,400.00	[2-Day] event
Sep 16	12:30	43	$10,300 Heads-Up No Limit Hold'em [High-Roller]	(Canada) Adonis112 (Olivier Busquet)	$224,000.00	64	$640,000.00	12 h 1 min
Sep 16	14:00	44	$2,100 No-Limit Hold’em	(United Kingdom) Aln_The_Kid (Tom Alner)	$370,207.88*	1,387	$2,774,000.00	[2-Day] event
Sep 17	11:00	45	$320 Pot Limit Omaha w/Rebuys [6-max]	(Russia) LuckyGump (Alexey Makarov)	$110,112.00	671 (815 R, 498 A)	$595,200.00	13 h 26 min
Sep 17	14:00	46	$320 No-Limit Hold’em [2X Chance]	(Panama) Puropoker123	$129,840.80	2,218 (680 Rebuys)	$869,400.00	[2-Day] event
Sep 17	17:00	47	$265 No-Limit Hold’em [Turbo, Knockout]	(Germany) busttard	$84,661.01*	3,339	$667,800.00	04 h 29 min
Sep 20	11:00	48	$320 Mixed [NL Hold'em / PL Omaha]	(Canada) mookstar	$59,362.08	1,132	$339,600.00	11 h 52 min
Sep 20	14:00	49	$530 Razz	(Canada) ZeeJustin (Justin Bonomo)	$36,765.16	387	$193,500.00	10 h 1 min
Sep 20	17:00	50	$1,050 No Limit Hold'em	(Finland) moukari6	$193,000.00*	1,308	$1,308,000.00	[2-Day] event
Sep 19	6:00	51	$215 No Limit Hold'em [1 Rebuy/1 Add-on]	(Russia) Alexx Porter	$76,227.04*	1,112 (765R,624A)	$500,200.00	15 h 10 min
Sep 19	11:00	52	$215 No-Limit Hold’em [Big Antes]	(Finland) jobetzu (Jorma Nuutinen)	$69,248.00	2,164	$432,800.00	[2-Day] event
Sep 19	14:00	53	$320 Pot Limit Omaha H/L	(Russia) Vlad_Radimov	$50,328.00	932	$279,600.00	12 h 17 min
Sep 20	6:00	54	$320 No-Limit Hold’em	(Bulgaria) Ned_bg (Nedelcho Karakolev)	$66,453.88*	1,594	$478,200.00	15 h 18 min
Sep 20	11:00	55	$530 No-Limit Hold'em w/Rebuys	(Canada) youaremelon	$199,739.75	744 (818 R) (615 A)	$1,088,500.00	14 h 07 min
Sep 20	14:00	56	$2,100 Pot Limit Omaha [6-max]	(Bulgaria) Darreta	$154,181.52*	519	$1,038,000.00	13 h 15 min
Sep 21	11:00	57	$530 No Limit Hold'em [1 Rebuy/1 Add-on]	(Russia) Ti0373 (Gleb Tremzin)	$155,817.40*	846 (610 R, 562 A)	$1,009,000.00	14 h 51 min
Sep 21	14:00	58	$1,050 Fixed Limit Hold'em [6-max]	(Mexico) SlickDickey	$57,420.00	261	$261,000.00	9 h 7 min
Sep 21	17:00	59	$215 No-Limit Omaha H/L	(Germany) Beckersen81	$33,372.00	927	$185,400.00	13 h 11 min
Sep 22	11:00	60	$700 Pot-Limit Omaha [Heads-Up]	(Russia) Danya Kop	$54,211.40*	418	$280,060.00	[2-Day] event
Sep 22	13:00	61	$320 No Limit Hold’em [SuperKnockout]	(Mexico) zackmorris99 (Zackary Morris)	$81,119.32	3,355	$516.670.00	16 h 31 min
Sep 22	15:00	62	$2,100 HORSE	(Canada) babyjess28 (Greg Mueller)	$71,775.00	165	$330,000.00	13 h 48 min
Sep 23	11:00	63	$215 No Limit Hold'em	(Canada) jakz101 (Eric Crain)	$281,524.39	9,569	$1,913.800.00	[2-Day] event
Sep 23	12:30	64	$10,300 8-game [High-Roller]	(Canada) JasonMercier (Jason Mercier)	$253,425.00	93	$930,000.00	14 h 52 min
Sep 23	14:30	65	$5,200 No-Limit Hold'em [Main Event]	(Russia) maratik (Marat Sharafutdinov)	$1,000,907.26*	1,825	$9,125,000.00	[2-Day] event

== 2013 events ==
There were 66 events in the 2013 WCOOP.

Date	Time (ET)	Event #	Event	Winner	Prize	Entries	Prize pool	Elapsed time
Sep 8	08:00	1	$109 NL Hold'em	(Russia) WithoutNickk (Sergey Pryadun)	$144,487.07*	11,799	$1,179,900.00	16 h 26 min
Sep 8	11:00	2	$215 NL Hold'em [6-Max]	(Romania) mariusflush (Marius Bumb)	$115,347.31*	6,622	$1,324,400.00	[2-Day] event
Sep 8	14:30	3	$215 NL Hold'em	(Sweden) murvl	$273,715.29*	11,381	$2,276,200.00	[2-Day] event
Sep 9	11:00	4	$320 Pot Limit Omaha	(Norway) Geggo08	$70,788.69*	1,607	$482,100.00	13 h 01 min
Sep 9	14:00	5	$320 No Limit Hold’em Shootout [6-Max]	(United Kingdom) Aduobe4 ()	$62,208.36	1,296	$388,800.00	13 h 26 min
Sep 9	17:00	6	$215 No Limit Hold'em Turbo w/Rebuys	(United Kingdom) 810ofclubs (Toby Lewis)	$189,379.23	2,090	$1,281,000.00	4 h 33 min
Sep 10	11:00	7	$215 NL 5-Card Draw	(Russia) -Rebus1980- (Gennadii Asafev)	$17,918.10	463	$92,600.00	12 h 13 min
Sep 10	14:00	8	$215 PL Courchevel H/L	(Norway) CaptainSmile (Einar Lindestad)	$24,333.51*	745	$149,000.00	[2-Day] event
Sep 10	17:00	9	$1,050 NL Hold'em	(United Kingdom) OMGjonyctt (Jonathan Concepcion)	$216,000.00*	1,821	$1,821,000.00	[2-Day] event
Sep 11	11:00	10	$215 PL Omaha [Knockout]	(United Kingdom) CrabMaki (David Shallow)	$40,369.72	1,490	$302,470.00	13 h 12 min
Sep 11	14:00	11	$320 NL Hold'em [Ante Up]	(Canada) Tha Giggy	$66,963.09	1,303	$393,900.00	[2-Day] event
Sep 11	17:00	12	$215 NL Hold'em [Heads Up]	(Russia) NikolasDLP (Nikolay Prokhorskiy)	$62,448.00*	2,124	$424,800.00	[2-Day] event
Sep 12	11:00	13	$215 NL Hold'em [Progressive KO]	(Netherlands) Nejra222	$60,579.62*	2,820	$572,460.00	[2-Day] event
Sep 12	14:00	14	$530 NL Hold'em [6-Max, Knockout]	(Estonia) remrem123	$110,572.10*	2,058	$1,039,290.00	[2-Day] event
Sep 12	17:00	15	$320 Stud H/L	(Russia) Scombat	$29,994.50	529	$158,700.00	[2-Day] event
Sep 13	11:00	16	$215 PL Omaha [6-Max]	(Russia) Yoo4 (Kirill Shugai)	$51,796.11*	1,823	$364,600.00	[2-Day] event
Sep 13	14:00	17	$215 NL Single Draw 2-7	(Russia) OhRaisyDaisy (Dmitriy Budnikov)	$16,851.00	411	$82,200.00	[2-Day] event
Sep 13	17:00	18	$320 NL Hold'em [Turbo, Zoom]	(Greece) proctus	$121,872.77	2,539	$761,700.00	4 h 25 min
Sep 14	11:00	19	$109 NL Hold'em	(Uruguay) paulwiter (Juan Garcia)	$143,397.49	9,748	$974,800.00	[2-Day] event
Sep 14	14:00	20	$320 NL Hold'em [Super-Knockout]	(Russia) NL_Profit (Anatoliy Filatov)	$98,343.48	3,940	$1,213,520.00	[2-Day] event
Sep 14	17:00	21	$320 PL Omaha H/L	(Panama) Gunslinger3 (David Bach)	$51,138.00	947	$284,100.00	[2-Day] event
Sep 15	11:00	22	$215 NL Hold'em	(Canada) Iftarii (Jonathan Jaffe)	$251,673.45*	9,394	$1,878,800	[2-Day] event
Sep 15	12:30	23	$10,300 NL Hold'em [8-Max, 2x Chance]	(Germany) MauriceSch (Maurice Schepp)	$533,200.00*	276	$2,980,000.00	[2-Day] event
Sep 15	14:30	24	$700 NL Hold'em	(Russia) vovanmillion (Vladimir Egorov)	$271,889.75*	3,491	$2,321,515.00	[2-Day] event
Sep 16	11:00	25	$215 NL Hold'em [4-Max]	(Netherlands) monpie120	$70,020.14	2,789	$557,800.00	[2-Day] event
Sep 16	14:00	26	$320 Stud	(Russia) veeea (Artem Vezhenkov)	$22,230.00	390	$117,000.00	[2-Day] event
Sep 16	17:00	27	$215 PL Omaha [Turbo, 1R1A]	(Sweden) IN_THE_Z0NE	$80,707.76	1,196	$467,600.00	4 h 15 min
Sep 17	11:00	28	$320 Mixed Hold'em	(Germany) Redbaron1308	$36,321.60	644	$193,200.00	[2-Day] event
Sep 17	14:00	29	$320 PL Badugi	(United Kingdom) stevie444 (Stephen Chidwick)	$16,321.58	279	$83,700.00	[2-Day] event
Sep 17	17:00	30	$1,050 NL Hold'em	(Ukraine) mr.MaxRipper	$246,921.63*	1,644	$1,644,000.00	[2-Day] event
Sep 18	11:00	31	$215 PL 5-Card Omaha H/L [6-Max, 2R1A]	(Australia) V_RouNder (Edison Nguyen)	$40,673.70	436	$210,200.00	[2-Day] event
Sep 18	14:00	32	$700 NL Hold'em [Progressive Knockout]	(Canada) CaLLitARUSH (Jacob Schindler)	$134,585.10	1,356	$905,130.00	[2-Day] event
Sep 18	17:00	33	$320 8-Game	(United Kingdom) Bassysaffari (Sebastian Saffari)	$36,519.00	658	$197,400.00	[2-Day] event
Sep 19	11:00	34	$320 NL Hold'em [6-Max]	(Canada) darrenelias (Darren Elias)	$76,032.00	1,536	$460,800.00	[2-Day] event
Sep 19	14:00	35	$320+R PL Omaha [6-Max]	(Russia) Yoo4 (Kirill Shugai)	$103,008.00	643	$556,800.00	[2-Day] event
Sep 19	17:00	36	$320 Triple Draw 2-7	(Portugal) mikexace	$20,649.20*	386	$115,800.00	[2-Day] event
Sep 20	11:00	37	$215+R NL Hold'em	(Turkey) phaplap (Ozgur Arda)	$117,946.52*	1,557	$806,200.00	[2-Day] event
Sep 20	14:00	38	$530 FL Omaha H/L	(Ukraine) tanya1604	$38,030.00*	425	$212,500.00	[2-Day] event
Sep 20	17:00	39	$215 NL Hold'em [6-Max]	(Russia) mypokerf	$91,829.94*	2,923	$584,600.00	[2-Day] event
Sep 21	11:00	40	$1,050 NL Hold'em [8-Max]	(United Kingdom) Zimmy86 (Zimnan Ziyard)	$182,856.62*	1,210	$1,210,000.00	[2-Day] event
Sep 21	14:00	41	$530 NL Hold'em [Super-Knockout]	(Austria) young_diam18 (Manuel Blaschke)	$99,692.80*	2,547	$1,304,064.00	[2-Day] event
Sep 21	17:00	42	$320 HORSE	(Canada) buzzard1881	$24,309.22*	576	$172,800.00	[2-Day] event
Sep 22	11:00	43	$215 NL Hold'em	(Switzerland) JNandez87 (Fernando Habegger)	$179,741.36*	8,313	$1,662,600.00	[2-Day] event
Sep 22	12:30	44	$10,300 NLHE [Heads-Up]	(Canada) mrGR33N13 (Daniel Colman)	$172,500.00*	61	$610,000.00	[2-Day] event
Sep 22	14:30	45	$2,100 NL Hold'em	(United Kingdom) paphiti	$480,101.70	1,437	$2,874,000.00	[2-Day] event
Sep 23	11:00	46	$320 PL 5-Card Omaha [6-Max, 1R1A]	(United Kingdom) milkybarkid (Ben Grundy)	$41,870.02*	462	$286,500.00	[2-Day] event
Sep 23	14:00	47	$320 NL Hold'em [3x Chance]	(Republic of Ireland) gavonater (Gavin O'Rourke)	$117,708.03*	2,018	$834,900.00	[2-Day] event
Sep 23	17:00	48	$215 NL Hold'em [Turbo, Knockout]	(Russia) RommyTheCute (Artem Romanov)	$103,511.87	4,076	$827,293.00	4 h 33 min
Sep 24	11:00	49	$320 Mixed NL Hold'em / PL Omaha	(Faroe Islands) forhelviti	$56,268.00	1,042	$312,600.00	[2-Day] event
Sep 24	14:00	50	$530 Razz	(Belarus) Philych_085	$33,013.91	343	$171,500.00	[2-Day] event
Sep 24	17:00	51	$1,050 NL Hold'em	(Brazil) vgreen22 (Diego Brunelli)	$258,910.00	1,523	$1,523,000.00	[2-Day] event
Sep 25	11:00	52	$215 NL Hold'em [1R1A]	(Gibraltar) maxxmeister	$97,070.00	1,306	$571,000.00	[2-Day] event
Sep 25	14:00	53	$215 NL Hold'em [Re-Entry, Big Antes]	(Poland) dadowiec	$90,400.00	1,903	$565,000.00	[2-Day] event
Sep 25	17:00	54	$2,100 PL Omaha [6-Max]	(Canada) LukeFromB13 (Luke Staudenmaier)	$130,873.56*	460	$920,000.00	[2-Day] event
Sep 26	11:00	55	$320 NL Hold'em	(Lithuania) RichieA7s (Rytis Praninskas)	$67,857.80*	1,526	$457,800.00	13 h 50 min
Sep 26	14:00	56	$530+R NL Hold'em	(Canada) 68ioweyou1	$118,756.05*	724	$982,000.00	14 h 20 min
Sep 26	17:00	57	$215 FL Hold'em	(Canada) CoooKay	$28,222.30	769	$153,800.00	11 h 9 min
Sep 27	11:00	58	$530 NL Hold'em [1R1A]	(Canada) pistons87 (Ankush Mandavia)	$157,578.25*	789	$898,500.00	15 h 9 min
Sep 27	14:00	59	$215 NL Omaha H/L	(Taiwan) joe1224	$39,190.16	1,121	$224,200.00	[2-Day] event
Sep 27	17:00	60	$1,050 FL Hold'em [6-Max]	(Canada) cosi	$49,220.00	214	$214,000.00	[2-Day] event
Sep 28	11:00	61	$700 PL Omaha [Heads-Up]	(Norway) maximum123	$53,924.45*	407	$270,655.00	[2-Day] event
Sep 28	14:00	62	$700 NL Hold'em [Progressive Super-Knockout]	(Australia) ValueFolding (Luke McLean)	$104,173.05*	2,467	$1,665,225.00	[2-Day] event
Sep 28	17:00	63	$2,100 HORSE	(Hungary) vachette17	$71,775.00	165	$1,210,000.00	[2-Day] event
Sep 29	11:00	64	$215 No Limit Hold'em [8-Max]	(Taiwan) Mrp1neApple (Kai Sheng Yang)	$208,682.58	9,678	$1,935,600.00	[2-Day] event
Sep 29	12:30	65	$10,300 8-game	(France) BiatchPeople (Alexandre Luneau)	$234,350.00	86	$860,000.00	14 h 43 min
Sep 29	14:30	66	$5,200 NL Hold'em Main Event	(Germany) PlayinWasted (David Kaufmann)	$1,493,499.15	2,133	$10,665,000.00	[2-Day] event

== 2014 events ==
There were 66 events in the 2014 WCOOP.

Date	Time (ET)	Event #	Event	Winner	Prize	Entries	Prize pool	Elapsed time
Sep 7	08:00	1	$109 NL Hold'em [WCOOP Kickoff]	(Estonia) RahvusKala	$137,289.83*	10,129	$1,012,900.00	[2-Day] event
Sep 7	11:00	2	$215 NL Hold'em [6-Max]	(Argentina) andresds (Andrés Dos Santos)	$155,000.00*	6,348	$1,269,600.00	[2-Day] event
Sep 7	14:30	3	$215 NL Hold'em	(Mexico) gutshtallin (Ryan Welch)	$200,280.71*	11,634	$2,326,800.00	[2-Day] event
Sep 8	11:00	4	$320 PL Omaha [6-Max]	(Russia) Creatiff111	$76,923.00	1,554	$466,200.00	12 h 18 min
Sep 8	14:00	5	$320 NL Hold'em [6-Max, Shootout]	(Netherlands) lehout	$58,435.74*	1,296	$388,800.00	13 h 46 min
Sep 8	17:00	6	$215+R NL Hold'em [Turbo]	(Canada) Gilbert978	$140,026.43*	2,126	$1,256,400.00	4 h 35 min
Sep 9	11:00	7	$215 NL Draw	(Argentina) scuel1975	$16,757.10	433	$86,600.00	12 h 27 min
Sep 9	14:00	8	$215 NL Omaha Hi/Lo [6-Max]	(Moldova) win to eat	$36,012.50	1,075	$215,000.00	13 h 9 min
Sep 9	17:00	9	$1,050 NL Hold'em	(Norway) Assad91	$303,164.40	1,848	$1,848,000.00	[2-Day] event
Sep 10	08:00	10	$215 PL Omaha [Knockout]	(Sweden) WhatIfGod	$31,204.81*	1,240	$251,720.00	12 h 48 min
Sep 10	11:00	11	$320 NL Hold'em [Ante Up]	(Mexico) plattsburgh (Matt Vengrin)	$56,376.40	1,044	$313,200.00	[2-Day] event
Sep 10	14:00	12	$215 NL Hold'em [Heads-Up]	(Canada) 360flip019	$46,185.54	1,830	$366,000.00	[2-Day] event
Sep 11	06:00	13	$215 NL Hold'em [Progressive Super-Knockout]	(Russia) niqx	$48,000.00*	3,647	$729,400.00	[2-Day] event
Sep 11	11:00	14	$530 NL Hold'em [6-Max, Knockout]	(United Kingdom) CHRISCCC	$105,989.04*	1,910	$964,550.00	[2-Day] event
Sep 11	14:00	15	$320 Stud H/L	(Germany) janik446	$27,588.00	484	$145,200.00	11 h 12 min
Sep 12	11:00	16	$215 PL Omaha [6-Max, Progressive Super-Knockout]	(Switzerland) naukil	$29,712.36	1,857	$371,400.00	12 h 22 min
Sep 12	14:00	17	$215 NL Single Draw 2-7 [Re-Entry]	(Mexico) Osracm	$19,742.19	508	$101,600.00	10 h 54 min
Sep 12	17:00	18	$320 NL Hold'em [Turbo, Zoom]	(United Kingdom) Aggro Santos (Scott Margereson)	$106,896.51	2,227	$668,100.00	4 h 41 min
Sep 13	11:00	19	$109 NL Hold'em	(Norway) mikal12345 (Mikal Blomlie)	$109,566.28*	7,801	$780,100.00	[2-Day] event
Sep 13	13:00	20	$320 NL Hold'em [Progressive Super-Knockout]	(Finland) Lrslzk (Sami Kelopuro)	$91,870.62	3,901	$1,170,300.00	[2-Day] event
Sep 13	15:00	21	$320 PL Omaha H/L [6-Max]	(Russia) akuza84	$42,788.01	809	$242,700.00	11 h 42 min
Sep 14	11:00	22	$215 NL Hold'em	(United Kingdom) Aggro Santos (Scott Margereson)	$202,000.00*	8,139	$1,627,800.00	[2-Day] event
Sep 14	12:30	23	$10,300 NL Hold'em [8-Max, Re-Entry, High Roller]	(Portugal) vicenfish (Vicente Delgado Zamorano)	$637,436.88*	365	$3,650,000.00	[2-Day] event
Sep 14	14:30	24	$700 NL Hold'em	(Russia) NikolasDLP (Nikolay Prokhorskiy)	$356,754.09	3,417	$2,272,305.00	[2-Day] event
Sep 15	11:00	25	$215 NL Hold'em [4-Max]	(Costa Rica) brianm15 (Brian England)	$68,558.92	2,219	$443,800.00	[2-Day] event
Sep 15	14:00	26	$320 Stud	(Mexico) dfunks (David Funkhouser)	$18,768.91	325	$97,500.00	9 h 43 min
Sep 15	17:00	27	$215 PL Omaha [Turbo,1R1A]	(Finland) Erä_Koira (Olli Ikonen)	$76,387.60	1,126	$437,000.00	4 h 00 min
Sep 16	11:00	28	$320 Mixed Hold'em	(Norway) Assad91	$27,930.00	490	$147,000.00	11 h 59 min
Sep 16	14:00	29	$320 FL Badugi	(Canada) hummylun (Jerry Wong)	$16,146.00	276	$82,800.00	11 h 40 min
Sep 16	17:00	30	$1,050 NL Hold'em	(Russia) MskrevFIX (Nikita Chubarov)	$273,192.50	1,631	$1,631,000.00	[2-Day] event
Sep 17	08:00	31	$215 PL 5-Card Omaha H/L [6-Max,2R1A]	(Russia) Kikki-mikk	$25,534.65*	396	$186,400.00	13 h 26 min
Sep 17	11:00	32	$700 NL Hold'em [Progressive Super-Knockout]	(Slovenia) D_owning_D	$103,315.65	1,942	$1,291,430.00	[2-Day] event
Sep 17	14:00	33	$320 8-Game	(Mexico) WhooooKidd (David "Bakes" Baker)	$34,909.50	629	$188,700.00	11 h 13 min
Sep 18	06:00	34	$320 NL Hold'em [6-Max, Re-Entry]	(Russia) Ch33s3z0r	$77,319.00	1,562	$468,600.00	[2-Day] event
Sep 18	11:00	35	$320+R PL Omaha [6-Max]	(Bulgaria) SpeedUp2	$73,782.50*	547	$445,800.00	12 h 55 min
Sep 18	14:00	36	$320 Triple Draw 2-7	(Poland) Colisea (Dzmitry Urbanovich)	$19,811.29*	372	$111,600.00	11 h 20 min
Sep 19	11:00	37	$215+R NL Hold'em	(Canada) AJacejackAJ	$101,854.64*	1,437	$740,600.00	[2-Day] event
Sep 19	14:00	38	$530 FL Omaha H/L	(Russia) aDrENalin710 (Denis Strebkov)	$30,151.71*	393	$196,500.00	10 h 46 min
Sep 19	17:00	39	$215 NL Hold'em [6-Max,10-Min Levels]	(United Kingdom) treven7	$59,975.61*	2,636	$527,200.00	8 h 9 min
Sep 20	11:00	40	$1,050 NL Hold'em [6-Max]	(Canada) hopezACE (Jean-Pascal Savard)	$193,630.00	1,156	$1,156,000.00	[2-Day] event
Sep 20	13:00	41	$530 NL Hold'em [Progressive Super-Knockout]	(Brazil) lipe piv (Felipe Boianovsky)	$102,898.73	2,605	$1,302,500.00	[2-Day] event
Sep 20	15:00	42	$320 HORSE	(Mexico) NoraFlum (Marco Johnson)	$29,994.50	529	$158,700.00	11 h 3 min
Sep 21	11:00	43	$215 NL Hold'em	(Poland) gregor7878 (Grzegorz Wyraz)	$186,963.64*	8,074	$1,614,800.00	[2-Day] event
Sep 21	12:30	44	$10,300 NLHE [High-Roller Heads-Up]	(Belgium) OtB_RedBaron (Jonas Mols)	$224,000.00	64	$640,000.00	16 h 59 min
Sep 21	14:30	45	$2,100 NL Hold'em	(Finland) Lateski (Lauri Varonen)	$488,095.00	1,457	2,914,000.00	[2-Day] event
Sep 22	11:00	46	$320 PL 5-Card Omaha [6-Max,1R1A]	(United Kingdom) Neptune04 (Richard Hawes)	$39,232.19*	490	$312,600.00	12 h 7 min
Sep 22	14:00	47	$320 NL Hold'em [Re-Entry]	(United Kingdom) Jareth3542 (Jareth East)	$132,199.50	2,789	$836,700.00	[2-Day] event
Sep 22	17:00	48	$215 NL Hold'em [Turbo, Knockout]	(Chile) PKaiser (Nicolas Fierro)	$87,923.86*	3,982	$808,346.00	4 h 29 min
Sep 23	11:00	49	$320 Mixed NL Hold'em / PL Omaha	(Canada) Roothlus (Adam Levy)	$41,572.23*	967	$290,100.00	13 h 12 min
Sep 23	14:00	50	$530 Razz	(Poland) __akun333___	$31,392.80*	364	$182,000.00	11 h 42 min
Sep 23	17:00	51	$1,050 NL Hold'em	(Ukraine) psyhoagromor (Gleb Kovtunov)	$242,383.65*	1,618	$1,618,000.00	[2-Day] event
Sep 24	08:00	52	$215 NL Hold'em [1R1A]	(Canada) G's zee (Shyam Srinivasan)	$97,954.00	1,306	$576,200.00	15 h 31 min
Sep 24	11:00	53	$215 NL Hold'em [Re-Entry, Big Antes]	(Brazil) chiconogue (Francisco Nogueira)	$79,808.00	2,494	$498,800.00	[2-Day] event
Sep 24	14:00	54	$2,100 PL Omaha [6-Max, Re-Entry]	(Argentina) allucan3at	$180,303.26*	599	$1,198,000.00	13 h 4 min
Sep 25	06:00	55	$320 NL Hold'em [6-Max]	(Sweden) WhatIfGod	$66,677.07	1,347	$404,100.00	14 h 11 min
Sep 25	11:00	56	$530+R NL Hold'em	(Russia) gipsy74 (Sergey Rybachenko)	$161,538.94	757	$943,500.00	13 h 45 min
Sep 25	14:00	57	$215 FL Hold'em [6-Max]	(Germany) Face333X (Martin Schleich)	$24,984.00	694	$138,800.00	10 h 41 min
Sep 26	11:00	58	$530 NL Hold'em [1R1A]	(Netherlands) Pappe_Ruk (Joep van den Bijgaart)	$159,186.25	790	$867,500.00	[2-Day] event
Sep 26	14:00	59	$215 NL Omaha H/L	(Ecuador) bianka15	$35,856.00	996	$199,200.00	13 h 43 min
Sep 26	17:00	60	$1,050 FL Hold'em [6-Max]	(Norway) Odd_Oddsen (Ola Amundsgard)	$44,640.00	186	$186,000.00	9 h 6 min
Sep 27	11:00	61	$700 PL Omaha [Heads-Up]	(Finland) hapina	$51,281.90*	394	$262,010.00	[2-Day] event
Sep 27	13:00	62	$700 NL Hold'em [6-Max, Progressive Super-Knockout]	(Germany) Afterpub	$114,901.76*	2,245	$1,492,925.00	[2-Day] event
Sep 27	15:00	63	$2,100 HORSE	(Canada) paulgees81 (Paul Volpe)	$66,442.50	173	$346,000.00	14 h 29 min
Sep 28	11:00	64	$215 NL Hold'em [8-Max]	(Netherlands) PhoenixAdler	$195,676.51*	8,589	$1,717,800.00	[2-Day] event
Sep 28	12:30	65	$10,300 8-Game [Re-Entry, High-Roller]	(Finland) kiiski (Jani Vilmunen)	$231,200.00	104	$1,040,000.00	14 h 29 min
Sep 28	14:30	66	$5,200 NL Hold'em Main Event	(Austria) CrownUpGuy (Fedor Holz)	$1,300,000.00*	2,142	$10,710,000.00	[2-Day] event

== 2015 events ==
There were 70 events in the 2015 WCOOP.

Date	Time (ET)	Event #	Event	Winner	Prize	Entries	Prize pool	Elapsed time
Sep 6	13:30	1	$109 NL Hold'em	(Costa Rica) RcknTheSbrbs (Pete Nigh)	$200,352.48*	2,502	$1,713,000.00	[2-Day] event
Sep 6	11:00	2	$215 NL Hold'em [6-Max]	(Ecuador) juswhackit	$156,617.50	5,135	$1,027,000.00	[2-Day] event
Sep 6	12:30	3	$10,300 NLHE [High-Roller, Heads-Up]	(Sweden) ChaoRen160 (Mikael Thuritz)	$196,000.00	56	$560,000.00	[2-Day] event
Sep 6	14:30	4	$215 NL Hold'em	(United Kingdom) V7JCV21	$260,193.87	8,673	$1,734,600.00	[2-Day] event
Sep 7	11:00	5	$215+R NL Hold'em [6-Max]	(Russia) MiracleQ	$101,575.49*	1,256	$708,000.00	[2-Day] event
Sep 7	17:00	6	$700 PL Omaha [6-Max]	(Mexico) plattsburgh (Matt Vengrin)	$90,157.72	769	$511,385.00	[2-Day] event
Sep 7	11:00	7	$700 NL Hold'em	(Canada) Showtime43	$98,048.91	1,843	$1,225,595.00	9 h 1 min
Sep 8	11:00	8	$700 NL Single Draw 2-7 Championship	(United Kingdom) Kashmir_uzi	$20,718.11	134	$89,110.00	[2-Day] event
Sep 8	14:00	9	$1,050 NL Hold'em	(Brazil) hellzito (William Arruda)	$259,202.80*	1,722	$1,722,000.00	[2-Day] event
Sep 8	17:00	10	$215 FL Hold'em [6-Max]	(Brazil) reidir (Reidir de Melo)	$20,862.00	549	$109,800.00	10 h 46 min
Sep 9	08:00	11	$215 NL Hold'em [Progressive Super-Knockout]	(Poland) Ojski1988	$56,035.19	3,569	$713,800.00	[2-Day] event
Sep 9	11:00	12	$700 NL Draw Championship	(Russia) Ti0373 (Gleb Tremzin)	$20,402.23	118	$78,470.00	[2-Day] event
Sep 9	14:00	13	$320 NL Hold'em [Heads-Up]	(Poland) Hookah17	$40,899.63*	1,021	$306,300.00	[2-Day] event
Sep 10	08:00	14	$215 NL Hold'em [Big Antes, Optional Re-Entry]	(Czech Republic) RuiNF (Rui Ferreira)	$59,904.00	1,872	$374,400.00	[2-Day] event
Sep 10	11:00	15	$215 PL Omaha [1R1A]	(Hungary) Nlzkm9	$57,362.10	740	$312,600.00	[2-Day] event
Sep 10	14:00	16	$1,050 NL Hold'em [Progressive Super-Knockout]	(Bulgaria) Liskacha	$149,941.70	1,828	$1,828,000.00	[2-Day] event
Sep 11	11:00	17	$700 NL Hold'em [6-Max,3-Stack]	(Hungary) pads1161 (Patrick Leonard)	$108,415.51	959	$637,735.00	[2-Day] event
Sep 11	14:00	18	$1,050 7-Card Stud Hi/Lo Championship	(Norway) Chillolini (Andre Messmer)	$40,237.50	185	$185,000.00	[2-Day] event
Sep 11	17:00	19	$320 NL Hold'em [Turbo, Zoom]	(Russia) moshmachine	$91,968.00	1,916	$574,800.00	4 h 15 min
Sep 12	11:00	20	$109 NL Hold'em [Optional Re-Entry]	(Romania) SQUA99	$85,205.12*	7,268	$726,800.00	[2-Day] event
Sep 12	14:00	21	$530 NL Hold'em [Progressive Super-Knockout]	(Switzerland) fixfixfix	$95,760.72	2,394	$1,197,000.00	[2-Day] event
Sep 12	17:00	22	$1,050 NL Omaha Hi/Lo Championship [6-Max]	(Canada) chickensssss	$50,356.78*	239	$239,000.00	[2-Day] event
Sep 13	08:00	23	$215 PL Omaha [Knockout]	(Sweden) Trymean77	$31,729.37*	1,368	$277,704.00	13 h 34 min
Sep 13	11:00	24	$215 NL Hold'em	(Ukraine) MaPuHo4Ka09	$150,338.68*	6,190	$1,238,000.00	[2-Day] event
Sep 13	12:30	25	$10,300 NL Hold'em [8-Max, Re-Entry, High-Roller]	(Germany) tobi123456	$654,500.00	340	$3,400,000.00	[2-Day] event
Sep 13	14:30	26	$700 NL Hold'em	(United Kingdom) wiisssppppaa (Andy Taylor)	$273,850.02*	3,418	$2,272,970.00	[3-Day] event
Sep 14	11:00	27	$215 PL Omaha [6-Max, Progressive Super-Knockout]	(Canada) goleafsgoeh (Mike Leah)	$28,432.42	1,777	$355,400.00	13 h 21 min
Sep 14	14:00	28	$320 NL Hold'em [6-Max]	(Sweden) bajskorven87	$95,161.50	2,014	$604,200.00	[2-Day] event
Sep 14	17:00	29	$700 7-Card Stud Championship	(Germany) TIETYMM (Markus Herbel)	$19,960.06	138	$91,770.00	[2-Day] event
Sep 15	11:00	30	$215 PL 5-Card Omaha H/L [6-Max,2R1A]	(Russia) nafnaf_funny	$38,040.00	396	$190,200.00	[2-Day] event
Sep 15	14:00	31	$1,050 NL Hold'em	(United Kingdom) aricontre (Javier Contreras)	$272,020.00	1,624	$1,624,000.00	[2-Day] event
Sep 15	17:00	32	$1,050 FL Omaha Hi/Lo Championship [8-Max]	(Germany) gettingpwned	$36,700.00*	208	$208,000.00	[2-Day] event
Sep 16	08:00	33	$700 FL Badugi Championship	(Belarus) ekziter (Anton Astapov)	$18,410.55	113	$75,145.00	[2-Day] event
Sep 16	11:00	34	$320 NL Hold'em [6-Max, Optional Re-Entry]	(Malta) viirusss (Yorane Kerignard)	$95,256.00	2,016	$604,800.00	[2-Day] event
Sep 16	14:00	35	$320+R PL Omaha [6-Max]	(Israel) viebu	$83,040.17*	553	$490,500.00	[2-Day] event
Sep 17	08:00	36	$215 NL Hold'em [1R1A]	(Australia) mjw006 (Matthew Wakeman)	$82,080.00	1,040	$456,000.00	[2-Day] event
Sep 17	11:00	37	$320 8-Game	(Norway) TheFish77	$30,381.00	533	$159,900.00	11 h 8 min
Sep 17	14:00	38	$1,050 NL Hold'em [Progressive Super-Knockout]	(Lebanon) antispeed	$146,395.00	1,748	$1,748,000.00	[2-Day] event
Sep 18	11:00	39	$700 Triple Draw 2-7 Championship	(Poland) gieras	$30,164.51	189	$125,685.00	[2-Day] event
Sep 18	14:00	40	$530 NL Hold'em [6-Max, Shootout]	(Mexico) THAY3R (Thayer Rasmussen)	$69,825.33*	720	$360,000.00	[2-Day] event
Sep 18	17:00	41	$320 NL Hold'em [Ante Up]	(Russia) 89rhino89 (Dmitry Ivanov)	$22,038.82*	572	$171,600.00	[2-Day] event
Sep 19	11:00	42	$215+R NL Hold'em	(Malta) bolivianSWAG (Michael Gathy)	$104,940.00	1,078	$583,000.00	[2-Day] event
Sep 19	14:00	43	$320 HORSE	(Greece) hangoverdose	$25,650.00	450	$135,000.00	10 h 47 min
Sep 19	17:00	44	$215 NL Hold'em [4-Max]	(Mexico) shaundeeb (Shaun Deeb)	$68,000.00	1,593	$400,000.00	[2-Day] event
Sep 20	08:00	45	$1,050 NL Hold'em [6-Max, Ultra-Deep]	(Belgium) WhoAreYoux1	$129,214.03*	912	$912,000.00	[2-Day] event
Sep 20	11:00	46	$215 NL Hold'em	(Netherlands) TheBeeftank	$184,120.03*	6,282	$1,256,400.00	[2-Day] event
Sep 20	12:30	47	$51,000 NL Hold'em [8-Max, Super High-Roller]	(Canada) Ben86 (Ben Tollerene)	$616,518.34*	46	$2,300,000.00	[2-Day] event
Sep 20	14:30	48	$2,100 NL Hold'em	(Czech Republic) 3P3NIPA (Pavel Plesuv)	$503,170.00	1,502	$3,004,000.00	[3-Day] event
Sep 21	11:00	49	$530 NL Hold'em [Optional Re-Entry]	(Netherlands) Popiedejopie (Erik van den Berg)	$100,801.30*	1,377	$688,500.00	[2-Day] event
Sep 21	14:00	50	$215 NL Hold'em [Knockout]	(Canada) vick23789	$90,458.29	3,562	$723,086.00	[2-Day] event
Sep 21	17:00	51	$1,050 PL Omaha Hi/Lo Championship [6-Max]	(Brazil) theNERDguy (Yuri Martins Dzivielevski)	$59,840.00	272	$272,000.00	[2-Day] event
Sep 22	11:00	52	$530 PL Omaha [6-Max, 3-Stack]	(Finland) I_Mr_U_Bean (Henri Koivisto)	$70,696.30	802	$401,000.00	[2-Day] event
Sep 22	14:00	53	$2,100 NL Hold'em	(Sweden) Mrdawwe (David Sonelin)	$348,695.15*	1,062	$2,124,000.00	[2-Day] event
Sep 22	17:00	54	$1,050 Razz Championship	(Finland) villepn	$40,020.00	184	$184,000.00	[2-Day] event
Sep 23	08:00	55	$320 PL 5-Card Omaha [6-Max,1R1A]	(Republic of Ireland) Skint Paddy	$34,386.00	250	$156,300.00	11 h 47 min
Sep 23	11:00	56	$530+R NL Hold'em	(Germany) maggess88	$132,583.50	560	$701,500.00	[2-Day] event
Sep 23	14:00	57	$2,100 PL Omaha Championship [6-Max]	(Sweden) IAmSoSo (Erik Tamm)	$129,263.31*	374	$748,000.00	[2-Day] event
Sep 24	08:00	58	$530 NL Hold'em [Ultra-Deep]	(United Kingdom) easylimp (Stefano Terziani)	$81,597.76*	1,132	$566,000.00	[2-Day] event
Sep 24	11:00	59	$215 NL Omaha Hi/Lo [6-Max]	(Russia) aDrENalin710 (Denis Strebkov)	$28,680.74*	878	$175,600.00	12 h 50 min
Sep 24	14:00	60	$2,100 NL Hold'em [Progressive Super-Knockout]	(Hungary) omaha4rollz (Laszlo Bujtas)	$212,556.80	1,216	$2,432,000.00	[2-Day] event
Sep 25	11:00	61	$700 NL Hold'em [1R1A]	(Sweden) eisenhower1 (Christian Jeppsson)	$105,942.56*	518	$706,230.00	[2-Day] event
Sep 25	14:00	62	$320 PL Omaha H/L [6-Max]	(Mexico) cal42688 (Calvin Anderson)	$36,019.50	649	$194,700.00	11 h 50 min
Sep 25	17:00	63	$1,050 FL Hold'em Championship [6-Max]	(Canada) KJulius10 (Kyle Julius)	$36,720.00	153	$153,000.00	[2-Day] event
Sep 26	11:00	64	$700 PL Omaha [Heads-Up]	(Denmark) uremyatm (Mikkel Kollerup Nielsen)	$51,890.01	289	$192,185.00	[2-Day] event
Sep 26	14:00	65	$700 NL Hold'em [6-Max, Progressive Super-Knockout]	(Canada) jbrown8777 (Joel Brown)	$110,970.75	2,119	$1,409,135.00	[2-Day] event
Sep 26	17:00	66	$2,100 HORSE Championship	(Russia) Maicoshaa	$58,290.00	134	$268,000.00	[2-Day] event
Sep 27	11:00	67	$215 NL Hold'em [8-Max, Optional Re-Entry]	(United Kingdom) Caesar325	$227,384.96*	8,872	$1,774,400.00	[2-Day] event
Sep 27	12:30	68	$10,300 8-Game Championship	(Russia) krakukra (Konstantin Maslak)	$214,050.00*	91	$910,000.00	[2-Day] event
Sep 27	14:30	69	$5,200 NL Hold'em Main Event	(Belgium) Coenaldinho7 (Kristof Coenen)	$1,300,000.00*	1,995	$10,000,000.00	[3-Day] event
Sep 27	18:30	70	$1,050 NL Hold'em [Turbo, Optional Re-Entry]	(Finland) calvin7v (Jussi Nevanlinna)	$309,372.50	1,847	$1,847,000.00	5 h 15 min

== 2016 events ==
There were 82 events in the 2016 WCOOP.

Date	Time (ET)	Event #	Event	Winner	Prize	Entries	Prize pool	Elapsed time
Sep 5	12:00	1	$109 NL Hold'em	(Argentina) jpgossn	$179,118.94	1,619	$1,641,600.00	[2-Day] event
Sep 4	11:00	2	$215 NL Hold'em [6-Max]	(Mexico) pablotenisis	$132,053.53	6,771	$1,354,200.00	[2-Day] event
Sep 4	12:30	3	$1,050 NL Hold'Em [Marathon Event]	(Australia) ishter11	$222,989.75	1,452	$1,452,000.00	[4-Day] event
Sep 4	14:00	4	$215 NL Hold'em	(Hungary) Perfect1232	$231,369.97	10,228	$2,045,600.00	[2-Day] event
Sep 4	17:00	5	$320 NL Omaha Hi/Lo [6-Max]	(Mexico) blanconegro (Connor Drinan)	$26,614.82	500	$150,000.00	[2-Day] event
Sep 5	10:00	6	$215+R NL Hold'Ee [6-Max]	(Sweden) eisenhower1	$72,339.49	834	$433,811.00	[2-Day] event
Sep 5	13:00	7	$700 NL Hold'em [8-Max, Progressive KO (50%)]	(Russia) CalmRevolver	$89,677.03	1,782	$592,515.00	9 h 6 min
Sep 5	16:00	8	$700 PL Omaha [3-Max, Progressive KO(25%), Zoom]	(United Kingdom) shamthedon	$53,453.07	591	$294,761.25	5 h 9 min
Sep 6	10:10	9	$1,050 NL Single Draw 2-7 Championship	(Germany) nilsef	$30,511.94	145	$145,000.00	[2-Day] event
Sep 6	13:00	10	$1,050 NL Hold'em [Super Tuesday SE]	(United Kingdom) MonsieurRask	$225,754.16	1,470	$1,470,000.00	[3-Day] event
Sep 6	16:00	11	$320 FL Omaha Hi/Lo [8-Max]	(Russia) nafnaf_funny	$19,545.82	416	$124,800.00	[2-Day] event
Sep 7	10:15	12	$1,050 NL 5-Card Draw Championship	(Mexico) shaundeeb (Shaun Deeb)	$22,185.60	95	$95,000.00	[2-Day] event
Sep 7	13:00	13	$215 NL Hold'em [Progressive KO (50%)]	(United Kingdom) tua133	$58,559.89	4,100	$410,000.00	[2-Day] event
Sep 7	16:00	14	$215 NL Hold'em [Big Antes]	(Costa Rica) brianm15 (Brian England)	$78,382.71	2,684	$536,800.00	[3-Day] event
Sep 8	10:00	15	$215 PL Omaha [1R1A]	(Philippines) Tgonz	$43,861.73	595	$248,472.00	[2-Day] event
Sep 8	13:00	16	$1,050 NL Hold'em [Progressive KO(50%), Thursday Thrill SE]	(Argentina) 88maca88	$121,841.69	1,602	$801,000.00	[3-Day] event
Sep 8	16:00	17	$320 Stud Hi/Lo	(Germany) Dosenpfand	$12,494.00	297	$89,100.00	[2-Day] event
Sep 9	10:15	18	$320 NL Hold'em [Heads-Up]	(Slovakia) prosvk	$31,670.00	624	$200,000.00	[2-Day] event
Sep 9	13:00	19	$1,050 7-Card Stud Hi/Lo Championship	(Denmark) CMoosepower	$34,028.00	168	$168,000.00	[2-Day] event
Sep 9	16:00	20	$320 NL Hold'em [3-Max, Turbo, Progressive KO(25%), Zoom]	(Germany) venced0r	$45,259.90	1,594	$358,650.00	5 h 40 min
Sep 10	04:00	21	$215 NL Hold'em	(Hungary) tomacampi	$51,855.50	1,713	$400,000.00	[2-Day] event
Sep 10	07:00	22	$215 PL 5-Card Omaha Hi/Lo [6-Max]	(Netherlands) onmybicycle	$21,808.67	634	$126,800.00	[2-Day] event
Sep 10	10:00	23	$10,300 NLHE [High-Roller, Heads-Up]	(Mexico) bambooeater	$162,000.00	36	$360,000.00	[2-Day] event
Sep 10	13:00	24	$530 NL Hold'em [Progressive KO(25%)]	(Canada) jbrown8777 (Joel Brown)	$97,819.34	1,718	$644,250.00	[2-Day] event
Sep 10	16:00	25	$1,050 NL Omaha Hi/Lo Championship [6-Max]	(Poland) Colisea (Dzmitry Urbanovich)	$54,217.80	283	$283,000.00	[2-Day] event
Sep 11	08:00	26	$215 PL Omaha [6-Max, Progressive KO (25%)]	(Kazakhstan) 3DTemujiN	$23,933.75	1,088	$163,200.00	[2-Day] event
Sep 11	11:00	27	$215 NL Hold'em [Deep Payouts, Sunday Warm-Up SE]	(Russia) Poleshchikov	$153,010.07	8,221	$1,644,200.00	[2-Day] event
Sep 11	12:30	28	$102,000 NL Hold'em [8-Max, Super High-Roller]	(Sweden) bencb789	$1,172,360.60	28	$2,800,000.00	[2-Day] event
Sep 11	14:00	29	$700 NL Hold'em [Sunday Million SE]	(Argentina) leitalopez (Leandro Bustillo)	$298,927.63	3,109	$2,067,485.00	[3-Day] event
Sep 11	17:00	30	$109 NL Hold'em [6-Max, Sunday Cool Down SE]	(Austria) pokerturo (Artur Koren)	$54,096.92	3,783	$378,300.00	[2-Day] event
Sep 12	10:00	31	$215+R NL Hold'em	(United Kingdom) Epiphany77 (Charlie Carrel)	$60,040.79	773	$385,091.00	[2-Day] event
Sep 12	13:00	32	$320 PL Omaha Hi/Lo [8-Max]	(Canada) blkcrow	$43,661.48	866	$259,800.00	[2-Day] event
Sep 12	16:00	33	$320 FL Hold'em [6-Max]	(Canada) UhhMee (Ami Barer)	$111,221.19	2,528	$758,400.00	[2-Day] event
Sep 13	10:00	34	$215 PL Omaha [6-Max, Progressive KO (50%)]	(Germany) Maxim737	$19,828.03	1,266	$126,600.00	[2-Day] event
Sep 13	13:00	35	$1,575 NL Hold'em [Super Tuesday SE]	(Finland) €urop€an (Samuel Vousden)	$297,450.00	1,215	$1,822,500.00	[2-Day] event
Sep 13	16:00	36	$1,050 PL Omaha Hi/Lo Championship [8-Max]	(Russia) aDrENalin710 (Denis Strebkov)	$63,780.33	377	$377,000.00	[2-Day] event
Sep 14	10:00	37	$215 NL Hold'em [2R1A]	(Bulgaria) Ohljo	$79,638.33	1,095	$489,433.00	[2-Day] event
Sep 14	13:00	38	$320 NL Hold'em [6-Max, Shootout]	(Poland) T3G3S	$46,368.36	966	$289,800.00	[2-Day] event
Sep 14	16:00	39	$1,050 FL Omaha Hi/Lo Championship [8-Max]	(Russia) Kroko-dill (Andrey Zaichenko)	$44,499.92	231	$231,000.00	[2-Day] event
Sep 15	10:00	40	$320 NL Hold'em [8-Max]	(Belarus) Kozir	$61,380.00	1,730	$519,000.00	[2-Day] event
Sep 15	13:00	41	$1,575 NL Hold'em [Progressive KO (50%), Thursday Thrill SE]	(Denmark) jonaj10	$140,071.99	1,260	$945,000.00	[2-Day] event
Sep 15	16:00	42	$320 Eight-Game	(Bosnia and Herzegovina) dejanaceking (Dejan Divkovic)	$34,439.15	748	$224,400.00	[2-Day] event
Sep 16	10:00	43	$1,050 Triple Draw 2-7 Championship	(Uruguay) SixthSenSe19 (Fabrizio Gonzalez)	$30,981.06	144	$144,000.00	[2-Day] event
Sep 16	13:00	44	$320 NL Hold'em [Progressive KO (33%), Ante Up]	(Russia) kawachi1984	$29,443.63	871	$174,200.00	[2-Day] event
Sep 16	16:00	45	$320 FL Hold'em [6-Max]	(Finland) mahmuttt88	$19,087.64	289	$100,000.00	[2-Day] event
Sep 17	04:00	46	$320 NL Hold'em	(Chile) tgc88070202	$52,524.61	1,076	$322,800.00	[2-Day] event
Sep 17	07:00	47	$1,050 FL Badugi Championship	(Russia) alex987	$20,243.23	69	$75,000.00	[2-Day] event
Sep 17	10:00	48	$215 NL Hold'em [8-Max, Progressive KO (25%)]	(Czech Republic) pappadogg	$52,265.58	2,364	$354,600.00	[2-Day] event
Sep 18	13:00	49	$700 NL Hold'em [Mix-Max, Part 3: 4-Max]	(Australia) djk123 (Dan Kelly)	$88,102.30	36	$500,000.00	7 h 18 min
Sep 17	16:00	50	$215 NL Single Draw 2-7 [Progressive KO (50%)]	(Ukraine) grailbrdss	$4,441.37	247	$24,700.00	[2-Day] event
Sep 18	08:00	51	$1,050 NL Hold'em [6-Max, Ultra-Deep]	(Canada) thx4urm0n3y (Lonnie Hallett)	$129,206.49	869	$869,000.00	[2-Day] event
Sep 18	11:00	52	$215 NL Hold'em [Sunday Warm-Up SE]	(Canada) leoc00	$222,159.66	7,893	$1,578,600.00	[2-Day] event
Sep 18	12:30	53	$10,300 NL Hold'em [8-Max, High-Roller]	(Mexico) Grindation	$584,415.23	356	$3,560,000.00	[2-Day] event
Sep 18	14:00	54	$2,100 NL Hold'em [Sunday Million SE]	(Mexico) bob43155	$407,633.02	1,304	$2,608,000.00	[2-Day] event
Sep 18	17:00	55	$530 NL Hold'em	(Russia) clinc3	$138,352.44	1,833	$916,500.00	11 h 9 min
Sep 19	10:00	56	$215 NL Hold'em [Progressive KO (25%)]	(Croatia) mario1335	$54,012.16	2,443	$366,450.00	[2-Day] event
Sep 19	13:00	57	$1,050 FL Hold'em Championship [6-Max]	(Belarus) Azrarn	$38,120.47	194	$194,000.00	[2-Day] event
Sep 19	16:00	58	$320 Razz	(Germany) chismann	$22,763.90	459	$137,700.00	[2-Day] event
Sep 20	10:00	59	$320 NL Hold'em [Win the Button]	(Hungary) sousinha23	$104,264.57	2,358	$707,400.00	[2-Day] event
Sep 20	13:00	60	$2,100 NL Hold'em [Super Tuesday SE]	(Hungary) jorginho88	$304,880.49	904	$1,808,000.00	[2-Day] event
Sep 20	16:00	61	$1,050 Razz Championship	(Cyprus) MITS 304	$38,987.76	196	$196,000.00	[2-Day] event
Sep 21	10:00	62	$530+R NL Hold'em	(Netherlands) marcasa	$91,540.33	366	$502,500.00	[2-Day] event
Sep 21	13:05	63	$2,100 PL Omaha Championship [6-Max]	(Canada) prepstyle71 (Patrick Serda)	$202,930.71	575	$1,150,000.00	[2-Day] event
Sep 21	16:00	64	$320 HORSE	(Russia) aDrENalin710 (Denis Strebkov)	$17,848.89	356	$106,800.00	[2-Day] event
Sep 22	10:00	65	$700 NL Hold'em [Ultra-Deep]	(Hungary) pads1161 (Patrick Leonard)	$162,054.98	1,605	$1,067,325.00	[2-Day] event
Sep 22	13:00	66	$2,100 NL Hold'em [Progressive KO (50%), Thursday Thrill SE]	(Romania) Nolez7 (Sean Winter)	$161,275.53	983	$983,000.00	[2-Day] event
Sep 22	16:00	67	$1,050 7-Card Stud Championship	(Poland) __akun333___	$28,104.51	127	$127,000.00	[2-Day] event
Sep 23	07:00	68	$320+R PL Omaha [6-Max]	(Mexico) PAW717	$43,626.16	257	$256,308.00	[2-Day] event
Sep 23	10:00	69	$700 NL Hold'em [6-Max, 5-Stack]	(Mexico) bob43155	$64,081.78	764	$508,060.00	[3-Day] event
Sep 23	13:00	70	$21,000 PL Omaha [6-Max, High-Roller]	(United Kingdom) ludovi333 (Ludovic Geilich)	$462,182.17	93	$1,906,500.00	[2-Day] event
Sep 23	16:00	71	$2,100 HORSE Championship	(Canada) KidPoker (Daniel Negreanu)	$61,865.47	147	$294,000.00	[2-Day] event
Sep 25	10:00	72	$109 NL Hold'em [Day 2]	(Canada) SSSMBRFC2/C (Jase Regina)	$153,551.90	1,954	$1,862,400.00	[2-Day] event
Sep 24	10:15	73	$700 PL Omaha [Heads-up]	(Netherlands) maggess88	$37,885.11	211	$140,315.00	[2-Day] event
Sep 24	13:00	74	$10,300 Eight-Game Championship	(Canada) SirWatts (Mike Watson)	$280,238.52	120	$1,200,000.00	[2-Day] event
Sep 24	16:00	75	$700 NL Hold'em [6-Max, Progressive KO (50%)]	(Czech Republic) FreeLancerZZ	$75,193.88	1,360	$547,800.00	[2-Day] event
Sep 25	13:00	76	$320 PL Omaha [Mix-Max, Part 2: 6-Max]	(Sweden) ISILDRooN (Leo Nordin)	$34,397.90	205	$200,000.00	[2-Day] event
Sep 25	11:00	77	$215 NL Hold'em [8-Max, Sunday Warm-Up SE]	(Denmark) mighty28	$264,885.15	9,666	$1,933,200.00	[2-Day] event
Sep 25	14:00	78	$5,000 NL Hold'em Main Event	(Germany) llJaYJaYll (Jonas Lauck)	$1,517,541.25	2,091	$10,052,879.79	[3-Day] event
Sep 25	17:00	79	$320 NL Hold'em	(Republic of Ireland) Noogaii	$120,008.69	3,338	$1,001,400.00	10 h 35 min
Sep 26	10:00	80	$700 NL Hold'em [1R1A]	(Canada) G's zee (Shyam Srinivasan)	$102,747.49	474	$575,621.00	[2-Day] event
Sep 26	13:00	81	$320 PL 5-Card Omaha [6-Max]	(Brazil) teruliro (Guilherme Beavis)	$51,267.22	1,239	$371,700.00	[2-Day] event
Sep 26	16:00	82	$1,050 NL Hold'em [Wrap-Up]	(Canada) NegroVente1	$156,290.44	1,239	$1,239,000.00	6 h 50 min

== 2017 events ==
There were 82 "High" events in the 2017 WCOOP, and PokerStars also introduced a "Low" buy-in WCOOP series, with the same events, to run concurrently.

HIGH

Date	Time (ET)	Event #	Event	Winner	Prize	Entries	Prize pool	Elapsed time
Sep 3	8:00	1	$215 NLHE [Sunday Kickoff SE]	(United Kingdom) carpediem200	$115,278.00	4,034	$806,800.00	[2-Day] event
Sep 3	11:00	2	$530 NLHE [6-Max, Progressive KO, Sunday Warm-Up SE]	(Czech Republic) serevsini	$106,262.93	2,943	$1,471,500.00	[2-Day] event
Sep 3	14:00	3	$1,050 NLHE [Sunday Million SE]	(Russia) KumariOy	$310,289.83	2,074	$2,074,000.00	[2-Day] event
Sep 3	16:00	4	$530 NLO8 [8-Max]	(United Kingdom) WeakyLeeks	$62,354.87	501	$250,500.00	[2-Day] event
Sep 4	10:30	5	$215 PLO [6-Max]	(Austria) Päffchen (Pascal Hartmann)	$37,014.66	1,165	$233,000.00	[2-Day] event
Sep 4	13:00	6	$1,050 NLHE [Progressive KO]	(Russia) veeea (Artem Vezhenkov)	$97,389.47	1,221	$1,221,000.00	[2-Day] event
Sep 4	15:30	7	$530 NLHE [8-Max]	(Croatia) josip1313	$93,988.27	1,180	$590,000.00	[2-Day] event
Sep 5	11:00	8	$215+R NLHE	(Netherlands) FluAnta	$94,644.43	1,002	$579,565.00	[2-Day] event
Sep 5	14:00	9	$530 NLHE [Half Price Super Tuesday]	(Austria) flauschi16	$197,977.83	2,679	$1,352,895.00	[2-Day] event
Sep 5	15:00	10	$1,050 Stud Hi/Lo	(Canada) hummylun (Jerry Wong)	$32,625.00	137	$150,000.00	[2-Day] event
Sep 6	10:30	11	$1,050 NL 5-Card Draw	(United Kingdom) thehushpuppy	$17,969.90*	81	$81,000.00	[2-Day] event
Sep 6	13:00	12	$1,050 NLHE [6-Max, Shootout]	(Chile) chilenocl (Nicolas Yunis)	$47,520.00	216	$216,000.00	[2-Day] event
Sep 6	14:30	13	$1,050 PLO8 [6-Max]	(Mexico) PearlJammer (Jon Turner)	$35,991.08*	208	$208,000.00	[2-Day] event
Sep 6	16:00	14	$215 NLHE [Bubble Rush]	(United Kingdom) Ahhh ls lt?	$68,721.63	2,320	$464,000.00	[2-Day] event
Sep 7	10:00	15	$1,050 NLHE [4-Max]	(Brazil) great dant (Bruno Volkmann)	$144,302.80*	862	$862,000.00	[2-Day] event
Sep 7	14:00	16	$530 NLHE [Progressive KO]	(Finland) messigoat10 (Tom Uebel)	$201,261.49	3,410	$1,722,050.00	[2-Day] event
Sep 7	15:30	17	215 8-Game	(Russia) ImluckNuts (Maksim Pisarenko)	$25,879.50	729	$145,800.00	[2-Day] event
Sep 8	12:00	18	$530 PNL Hold'em [8-Max]	(Germany) knaller77	$53,235.93	610	$305,000.00	[2-Day] event
Sep 8	13:30	19	$1,050+R PLO [6-Max]	(Poland) magiet12	$100,188.75*	174	$552,000.00	[2-Day] event
Sep 8	16:00	20	$530 NLHE [3-Max, Turbo, Progressive KO, Zoom]	(Netherlands) Graftekkel	$53,659.31*	1,558	$779,000.00	6 h 12 min
Sep 9	04:00	21	$215 NLHE [8-Max]	(Germany) LoosControl	$42,138.43	1,367	$273,400.00	[2-Day] event
Sep 9	10:00	22	$530 NLHE [Win the Button]	(Austria) OverTheTop43 (Jan Schwippert)	$81,648.18	991	$495,500.00	[2-Day] event
Sep 9	13:00	23	$1,050 NLHE [6-Max]	(Germany) Fresh_oO_D (Jens Lakemeier)	$97,459.68*	690	$690,000.00	[2-Day] event
Sep 9	14:30	24	$1,050 NL 2-7 Single Draw	(Russia) WTFOMFGOAO	$26,512.50	101	$101,000.00	[2-Day] event
Sep 10	08:00	25	$215 NLHE [6-Max, Progressive KO, Sunday Kickoff SE]	(Poland) OMGACEACEACE	$50,780.12	3,544	$708,800.00	[2-Day] event
Sep 10	11:00	26	$1,050 NLHE [8-Max, Sunday Warm-Up SE]	(Poland) wiciu777	$222,246.70	1,442	$1,442,000.00	[2-Day] event
Sep 10	14:00	27	$530 NLHE [Sunday Million SE]	(Canada) PureCash25 (Nick Rampone)	$256,502.18	3,574	$1,787,000.00	[2-Day] event
Sep 10	16:30	28	$215 NLHE	(Brazil) Andreflk13 (André Figueiredo)	$108,533.51	3,794	$758,800.00	13 h 31 min
Sep 11	11:30	29	$2,100 NLO8 [6-Max]	(Finland) Kekkhou	$53,504.90	119	$238,000.00	[2-Day] event
Sep 11	13:30	30	$215 NLHE [Progressive KO]	(Germany) DSmunichlife	$52,722.77	3,686	$737,200.00	[2-Day] event
Sep 16	15:00	31	$215 HORSE [Phase 2]	(Hungary) Iteopepe88 (Peter Gelencser)	$41,098.64	103	$200,000.00	[2-Day] event
Sep 11	17:00	32	$530 NLHE [6-Max]	(Russia) nsmirnov	$62,040.83	731	$365,500.00	[2-Day] event
Sep 12	10:00	33	$530 PLO [4-Max, Progressive KO]	(Ukraine) plspaythxbye	$47,093.99*	1,088	$544,000.00	[2-Day] event
Sep 12	14:00	34	$1,050 NLHE [8-Max, Super Tuesday SE]	(Belgium) girafganger7	$196,939.84	1,260	$1,260,000.00	[2-Day] event
Sep 13	13:00	35	$530 NLHE	(Romania) p.A.v magic	$87,214.83*	1,348	$674,000.00	[2-Day] event
Sep 13	14:30	36	$1,050 FL Badugi	(Norway) paaskebaesen	$20,437.50	75	$75,000.00	[2-Day] event
Sep 13	16:00	37	$215 NLHE [6-Max, Zoom]	(Uruguay) IlDepredator	$79,872.83	2,731	$546,200.00	10 h 13 min
Sep 14	10:30	38	$215 NLHE [6-Max]	(China) jeffzhang888	$64,024.25	2,141	$428,200.00	[2-Day] event
Sep 14	14:00	39	$1,050 NLHE [8-Max, Progressive KO, Thursday Thrill SE]	(Uruguay) CROSA COLL (Martin Santiago)	$113,281.28	1,470	$1,470,000.00	[2-Day] event
Sep 14	15:30	40	$530 5-Card PLO [6-Max]	(Costa Rica) Big Huni (Chris Hunichen)	$53,537.37	609	$304,500.00	[2-Day] event
Sep 15	09:00	41	$530 NLHE	(United Kingdom) thehushpuppy	$57,005.08	658	$329,000.00	11 h 49 min
Sep 15	13:30	42	$1,050 NLHE/PLO [6-Max]	(Ukraine) plspaythxbye	$86,409.60	487	$487,000.00	[2-Day] event
Sep 15	16:00	43	$215+R NLHE [3-Max, Turbo, Zoom]	(Austria) MLS20	$74,098.39	820	$428,330.00	6 h 20 min
Sep 16	07:00	44	$530 NLHE [Progressive KO]	(Cyprus) anti-durrr	$39,218.12	952	$476,000.00	[2-Day] event
Sep 16	10:00	45	$215+R NLHE [6-Max]	(Malta) philbort (Philipp Gruissem)	$75,414.36	676	$438,480.00	[2-Day] event
Sep 16	13:00	46	$1,050 NLO8 [6-Max]	(Netherlands) raare01	$50,582.46	265	$265,000.00	[2-Day] event
Sep 16	14:30	47	$2,100 NLHE [8-Max]	(Canada) ruthless848	$207,240.30	587	$1,174,000.00	[2-Day] event
Sep 17	08:00	48	$215 NLHE [8-Max, Sunday Kickoff SE]	(Ukraine) Spacey-Space	$71,802.82*	2,672	$534,400.00	[2-Day] event
Sep 17	11:00	49	$215 NLHE [Progressive KO, Sunday Warm-Up SE]	(Brazil) Thiago Wks. (Thiago Wildener)	$87,487.13	6,156	$1,231,200.00	[2-Day] event
Sep 17	14:00	50	$2,100 NLHE [Sunday Million SE]	(United Kingdom) power2prut	$373,744.14*	1,236	$2,472,000.00	[2-Day] event
Sep 17	15:00	51	$25,000 PLO [6-Max, High Roller]	(Slovakia) Zagalo87 (Pedro Zagalo)	$419,038.62*	71	$1,741,275.00	[2-Day] event
Sep 18	11:30	52	$1,050 Razz	(Canada) L1TE-BR1TE	$34,944.16*	177	$177,000.00	[2-Day] event
Sep 18	13:30	53	$530 NLHE	(Netherlands) DeuceofDuc0	$119,587.54*	1,729	$864,500.00	[2-Day] event
Sep 18	16:00	54	$215 NLHE [6-Max, Progressive KO]	(Brazil) THE ONLY SON	$39,161.94	2,678	$535,600.00	[2-Day] event
Sep 19	10:30	55	$215 NLHE [8-Max, Win the Button]	(Netherlands) etxnl01	$45,190.02	1,466	$293,200.00	[2-Day] event
Sep 19	12:00	56	$530 NL Courchevel Hi/Lo [6-Max]	(Finland) miikka84	$26,798.93*	298	$149,000.00	[2-Day] event
Sep 19	14:00	57	2,100 NLHE [Super Tuesday SE]	(Austria) Tankanza (Gianluca Speranza)	$230,740.32*	726	$1,452,000.00	[2-Day] event
Sep 19	15:00	58	$2,100 HORSE	(Sweden) Isildur1 (Viktor Blom)	$60,760.00	124	$248,000.00	[2-Day] event
Sep 20	10:00	59	$530 NLHE [6-Max, Progressive KO]	(Canada) Carster (Carlos Chadha)	$58,119.09	1,525	$762,500.00	[2-Day] event
Sep 20	12:00	60	$2,100 FL Triple Draw 2-7	(Russia) kkopghy	$52,320.00	96	$192,000.00	[2-Day] event
Sep 20	13:00	61	$2,100 NLHE [Heads-Up]	(Austria) 0$kar15	$66,899.98*	128	$256,000.00	[2-Day] event
Sep 20	14:30	62	$530 PLO8 [8-Max]	(Mexico) blanconegro (Connor Drinan)	$37,999.85	424	$212,000.00	[2-Day] event
Sep 20	16:00	63	$215 NLHE	(United Kingdom) jAkDAriPAA (Jack O'Neill)	$53,897.70	1,780	$356,000.00	[2-Day] event
Sep 21	10:30	64	$1,050 PLO [6-Max]	(Russia) ghost crab	$107,869.46*	698	$698,000.00	[2-Day] event
Sep 21	14:00	65	$2,100 NLHE [Progressive KO, Thursday Thrill SE]	(United Kingdom) prebz (Preben Stokkan)	$160,824.57	976	$1,952,000.00	[2-Day] event
Sep 21	15:00	66	$25,000 NLHE [8-Max, High Roller]	(Canada) caecilius (Nick Petrangelo)	$624,676.53*	149	$3,654,225.00	[2-Day] event
Sep 21	15:30	67	$1,050 Stud	(Germany) Fresh_oO_D (Jens Lakemeier)	$25,725.00	105	$105,000.00	[2-Day] event
Sep 21	17:00	68	$215 NLHE [8-Max]	(Canada) WalmartCNXN (Mike Farrow)	$45,031.47	1,476	$295,200.00	[2-Day] event
Sep 22	11:00	69	$1,050 FLHE [6-Max]	(Russia) Mordnilap	$35,702.52	179	$179,000.00	11 h 52 min
Sep 22	12:30	70	$530 NLHE [6-Max]	(Russia) 84BUKTOP84	$89,798.88	1,101	$550,500.00	13 h 49 min
Sep 22	14:30	71	$1,050 FLO8 [8-Max]	(Russia) Kroko-dill (Andrey Zaichenko)	$36,700.23	185	$185,000.00	[2-Day] event
Sep 22	16:00	72	$215 PLO [Heads-Up, Progressive Total KO, Zoom]	(Armenia) gugom	$25,205.62	1,409	$281,800.00	7 h 44 min
Sep 23	06:00	73	$215 NLHE	(Brazil) reyals_rs	$39,319.99	1,259	$251,800.00	[2-Day] event
Sep 23	10:00	74	$530 NLHE	(Russia) Futti18	$85,815.14	1,051	$525,500.00	[2-Day] event
Sep 23	13:00	75	$10,300 8-Game [High Roller]	(Sweden) compris	$247,975.00	91	$910,000.00	[2-Day] event
Sep 23	16:00	76	$1,050 NLHE [6-Max, Turbo, Progressive KO]	(United Kingdom) SkaiWalkurrr (Rachid Ben Cherif)	$116,008.79	1,522	$1,522,000.00	5 h 30 min
Sep 24	08:00	77	$1,050 NLHE [Sunday Kickoff SE]	(Austria) OverTheTop43 (Jan Schwippert)	$193,318.63	1,238	$1,238,000.00	[2-Day] event
Sep 24	11:00	78	$530 NLHE [Sunday Warm-Up SE]	(Netherlands) Erikajax1	$219,090.38	3,024	$1,512,000.00	[2-Day] event
Sep 24	14:00	79	$5,200 NLHE [Main Event]	(Netherlands) SvZff (Steven van Zadelhoff)	$1,624,502.27	2,183	$10,915,000.00	[3-Day] event
Sep 24	17:00	80	$215 NLHE [8-Max]	(Bulgaria) FeriBo (Fahredin Mustafov)	$117,260.19	4,105	$821,000.00	[2-Day] event
Sep 25	15:00	81	$530 NLHE [Wrap-Up]	(Belarus) Leqenden (Ilya Anatskiy)	$101,734.89	1,303	$651,500.00	10 h 39 min
Sep 10	15:00	82	$10,300 NLHE [High Roller]	(Canada) prepstyle71 (Patrick Serda)	$469,180.91	244	$2,440,000.00	[2-Day] event

LOW

Event	Buy-in	Prize pool	Winner	Prize	
#1: NLHE-L	$11	$124,100	A.barmot.O	$15,934	
#2: NLHE-L 6-Max Progressive KO	$27	$319,420	Nicolas "PKaiser" Fierro	$25,832	†
#3: NLHE-L	$55	$372,400	PaolinoBR	$46,470	
#4: NLO8-L 8-Max	$27	$76,964	spanishfish91	$11,114	
#5: PLO-L 6-Max	$11	$44,870	Luckkozak	$4,997	
#6: NLHE-L Progressive KO	$55	$518,000	simbadac	$37,504	†
#7: NLHE-L 8-Max	$27	$182,799	mezziw	$25,884	
#08 NLHE-L Rebuy	$11	$183,720	Shmikis_neas	$24,178	
#09 NLHE-L	$27	$340,361	jesuismary	$42,292	
#10 Stud8-L	$55	$52,000	kenyer8	$9,360	
#11 NL 5 Card Draw-L	$55	$34,600	avto-lide777	$6,100	
#12 NLHE-L Shootout	$55	$147,800	gerlucker	$23,648	
#13 PLO8-L 6-Max	$55	$74,200	Ami "UhhMee" Barer	$11,320	
#14 NLHE-L Bubble Rush	$11	$136,890	brunofpls	$15,185	
#15 NLHE-L 4-Max	$55	$231,500	TheSnaiL	$28,489	
#16 NLHE-L 6-Max Progressive KO	$27	$489,207	Stacked-u-2	$31,458	†
#17 8-Game-L	$11	$40,880	stacyp89	$6,236	
#18 PNLHE-L 8-Max	$27	$109,002	Daniel "judgedredd13" Charlton	$15,551	
#19 PLO-L 6-Max	$55	$145,930	jc_bluej	$23,846	
#20 NLHE-L 3-Max, Turbo, Progressive KO	$27	$298,454	mear987	$24,410	†
#21 NLHE-L 8-Max	$11	$75,960	szwajcar1979	$8,342	
#22 NLHE-L Win the Button	$27	$284,191	Victor "VibizSbrissa" Sbrissa	$34,935	
#23 NLHE-L 6-Max	$55	$398,700	Andre "AndreBusato" Busato DeOliveira	$39,867	
#24 2-7 Single Draw-L	$55	$32,400	sylby88	$5,988	
#25 NLHE-L PKO 6-Max	$11	$103,280	llblOlyll	$9,570	†
#26 NLHE-L 8-Max	$55	$257,750	Tazzy791	$15,282	
#27 NLHE-L	$27	$199,395	camelot1988	$26,147	
#28 NLHE-L	$11	$114,470	SOUFODAMS	$15,282	
#29 NLO8-L 6-Max	$109	$81,800	shrekpoker91	$12,450	
#30 NLHE-L PKO	$11	$178,740	voicutudor	$11,102	†
#31 HORSE-L Phase 2	$11	$75,000	BustiJauli	$11,484	
#32 NLHE-L 6-Max	$27	$106,129	bigbang201	$12,589	
#33 PLO-L 4-Max PKO	$27	$141,089	URMYLeNoR	$14,081	†
#34 NLHE-L	$55	$302000	guicosta94	$42,922	
#35 NLHE-L	$27	$219,599	SlippedMe	$25,378	
#36 FL Badugi-L	$55	$28,100	Abit9144	$5,28	
#37 NLHE-L 6-Max Zoom	$11	$138,800	Skojjigt	$15,676	
#38 NLHE-L	$11	$93,140	missdj2013	$12,909	
#40 5 Card PLO-L 6-Max	$27	$66,702	Kelvin "Kelvin_FP:AR" Kerber	$9,750	
#41 NLHE-L	$27	$133,478	beerwurst	$18,982	
#42 NLHE/PLO-L 6-Max	$55	$124,650	C4RLOS1971	$18,316	
#43 NLHE-L Zoom Rebuy	$11	$141,180	Stoqnov303	$20,076	
#44 NLHE-L PKO	$27	$241,130	ABORDAGE	$23,335	†
#45 NLHE-L 6-Max	$11+R	$196,740	lopan83	$27,957	
#46 NLO8-L 6-Max	$55	$114,000	ahhoo	$16,892	
#47 NLHE-L 8-Max	$109	$832,500	Felipe “hipowrock” Bozzetti Pasqual	$108,059	
#48 NLHE-L 8-Max	$11	$67,040	MohammedBin84	$9,531	
#49 NLHE-L PKO	$11	$159,080	kudur	$10,837	†
#50 NLHE-L	$109	$386,400	Joakim "joocs" Anjou	$32,546	
#51 PLO-L High Roller 6-Max	$1,060		Alex "dynolot" Difelice	$102,644	
#52 Razz-L	$57,950	$55	alladin1980	$8,584	
#53 NLHE-L	$27	$305,254	odessit1982	$39,181	
#54 NLHE-L PKO 6-Max	$11	$117,520	38bf46	$10,177	†
#55 NLHE-L Win the Button 8-Max	$11	$84,740	romulocsar	$11,898	
#56 NL Courchevel Hi/Lo-L 6-Max	$27	$50,892	vovtroy	$6,155	
#57 NLHE-L	$109	$398,500	Cristiano "cristianooft" Lino Pires	$56,971	
#58 HORSE-L	$109	$82,000	BustiJauli	$15,170	
#59 NLHE-L 6-Max, PKO	$27	$243,634	Bravo-tmb	$22,009	†
#60 2-7 TD-L	$109	$57,000	Senkel92	$10,286	†
#61 NLHE-L Heads-Up	$109	$123,600	Yvii_8	$15,597	
#62 PLO8-L 8-Max	$27	$70,9988	chickensssss	$10,317	
#63 NLHE-L	$11	$84,940	April Bowlby	$11,927	
#64 PLO-L 6-Max	$55	$149,500	PolecatRider	$21,609	
#65 NLHE-L Progressive KO	$109	$617,800	DeGhjalt	$39,309	†
#66 NLHE-L 8-Max High Roller	$1,050	$981,000	Joseph “jughead11” Lacasse	$142,454	
#67 Stud-L	$55	$31,350	rubak787	$5,878	
#68 NLHE-L 8-Max	$11	$75,050	gabsdrogba	$10,629	
#69 LHE-L	$55	$41,700	Dragon_JD	$6,215	
#70 NLHE-L 6-Max	$27	$201,629	Juchem1006	$28,310	
#71 FLO8-L	$55	$54,100	BRAZZMONKEY	$8,693	
#72 PLO-L Heads-Up, Progressive Total KO, Zoom	$215	$74,620	dav8429	$3,430	†
#73 NLHE-L	$11	$103,390	Lukas "parednis" Parednis	$13,830	
#74 NLHE-L	$27	$314,903	marbar1992	$39,905	
#75 8-Game-L High Roller	$530	$177,000	Maiccoshaa	$35,400	
#76 NLHE-L 6-Max PKO Turbo	$55	$709,300	Pedro Vinícius "pvigar" Garagnani	$45,980	†
#77 NLHE-L	$55	$142,550	Marios "Jully-19" Mansour	$19,114	
#78 NLHE-L	$27	$201,163	doubleace90	$21,524	
#79 NLHE-L Main Event	$215	$3,125,200	jaloviina007	$331,279	
#80 NLHE-L 8-Max	$11	$110,190	o autistia	$13,465	
#81 NLHE-L Wrap-Up	$27	$185,598	NaNiJuKo	$26,312	
#82 NLHE-L High Roller	$530	$677,500	$odomiz€r	$104,803	

† includes bounties

== 2018 events ==
There were 186 events in the 2018 WCOOP.

Event #	Event	Winner	Prize	Entries	Prize pool
1L	$2.20 NLHE [Phase 2], $250K Gtd	(United Kingdom) JimBigChips	$20,062.46	10,927	$277,977.00
1M	$22 NLHE [Phase 2], $1M Gtd	(Austria) Faboulus888	$95,000.00*	5,281	$1,221,700.00
1H	$215 NLHE [Phase 2], $2M Gtd	(Sweden) ForzaVaxholm (Kent Lundmark)	$225,006.22	1,081	$2,289,400.00
2L	11 NLHE, $100K Gtd	(United Kingdom) jroze99	$17,772.29	16,729	$163,944.20
2M	$109 NLHE [Sunday Kickoff SE], $300K Gtd	(Russia) MCvisitor	$53,941.13	3,768	$376,800.00
2H	$1,050 NLHE, $500K Gtd	(Austria) BrightStripe	$76,314.44*	504	$504,000.00
3L	$22 NLHE [8-Max, Progressive KO], $250K Gtd	(United Kingdom) lozanova.uk	$17,052.57*	17,209	$344,180.00
3M	$215 NLHE [8-Max, Progressive KO, Sunday Warm-Up SE], $750K Gtd	(Cyprus) wvwMasteRwvw	$62,603.44	4,389	$877,800.00
3H	$2,100 NLHE [8-Max, Progressive KO], $1M Gtd	(Austria) nailuj90 (Julian Stuer)	$96,971.08	459	$1,000.000
4L	$22 NLHE [Mini Sunday Million SE], $250K Gtd	(Canada) edoiler	$35,680.01	18,532	$370,640.00
4M	$215 NLHE [Sunday Million SE], $1M Gtd	(Romania) jah1923	$193,055.14	6,794	$1,358.800
4H	$2,100 NLHE, $1M Gtd	(Sweden) 42ayay	$147,384.81	477	$1,000.000
5L	$11 PLO [6-Max], $50K Gtd	(Hungary) Hulkyyyy	$11,761.09	8,548	$83,770.40
5M	$109 PLO [6-Max], $200K Gtd	(Russia) aDrENalin710 (Denis Strebkov)	$31,824.30	2,133	$213,300.00
5H	$1,050 PLO [6-Max], $500K Gtd	(Finland) I_Mr_U_Bean (Henri Koivisto)	$89,248.90	482	$500,000.00
6L	$5.50 NLHE [8-Max, Turbo], $50K Gtd	(Brazil) GStronda (Gillian Conrado)	$7,643.02	12,106	$59,319.40
6M	$55 NLHE [8-Max, Turbo], $200K Gtd	(Lithuania) Gintaras2192	$38,189.04	5,370	$268,500.00
6H	$530 NLHE [8-Max, Turbo], $400K Gtd	(Mexico) TheDegenFund	$61,597.15*	876	$438,000.00
7L	$11 NLO8 [6-Max], $35K Gtd	(Germany) DaCus3	$6,781.39*	5,747	$56,320.60
7M	$109 NLO8 [6-Max], $100K Gtd	(Switzerland) TonyYayo5	$16,486.44*	1,282	$128,200.00
7H	$1,050 NLO8 [6-Max], $200K Gtd	(Germany) niself	$41,878.15*	237	$237,000.00
8L	$5.50 NLHE [Progressive KO], $100K Gtd	(Greece) baggelis26	$8,011.09	33,835	$165,791.50
8M	$55 NLHE [Progressive KO], $400K Gtd	(Brazil) felipe52 (Felipe Theodoro)	$42,960.06	13,829	$691,450.00
8H	$530 NLHE [Progressive KO], $750K Gtd	(Romania) vvvpoker	$78,722.86	2,112	$1,056,000.00
9L	$11 NL 2-7 Single Draw, $15K Gtd	(Finland) calvin7v (Jussi Nevanlinna)	$2,563.18	1,951	$19,119.80
9M	$109 NL 2-7 Single Draw, $30K Gtd	(Russia) Premove	$6,951.00	331	$33,100.00
9H	$1,050 NL 2-7 Single Draw, $100K Gtd	(Belgium) merla888 (Michael Gathy)	$26,250.00	98	$100,000.00
10L	$22 NLHE [8-Max, Win the Button], $75K Gtd	(Brazil) GeraldoCesar	$18,414.30	6,478	$129,560.00
10M	$215 NLHE [8-Max, Win the Button], $200K Gtd	(Norway) Senkel92 (Tobias Leknes)	$44,064.08	1,436	$287,200.00
10H	$2,100 NLHE [8-Max, Win the Button], $400K Gtd	(Germany) niself	$74,459.48*	199	$400,000.00
11L	$22 Razz, $35K Gtd	(Sweden) sqmpork	$6,269.20*	2,040	$40,800.00
11M	$215 Razz, $75K Gtd	(Netherlands) SM4RTASS	$15,390.00	405	$81,000.00
11H	$2,100 Razz, $150K Gtd	(Russia) aDrENalin710 (Denis Strebkov)	$49,595.00	91	$182,000.00
12L	$109 NLHE [8-Max], $400K Gtd	(United Kingdom) ImRichAreU?	$55,022.25*	4,915	$491,500.00
12M	$1,050 NLHE [8-Max, Super Tuesday SE], $1M Gtd	(Mexico) DeosOner	$173,957.93	1,092	$1,092,000.00
12H	$10,300 NLHE [8-Max, High Roller], $1M Gtd	(United Kingdom) SkaiWalkurrr (Rachid Ben Cherif)	$367,001.22	185	$1,850,000.00
13L	$11 FLO8 [8-Max], $25K Gtd	(Chile) oyarzun2010	$4,144.14	2,910	$28,518.00
13M	$109 FLO8 [8-Max], $50K Gtd	(Republic of Ireland) rtspurs	$8,820.85*	553	$55,300.00
13H	$1,050 FLO8 [8-Max], $100K Gtd	(Chile) jdaz111293	$24,426.16	106	$106,000.00
14L	$11 NLHE [Progressive KO], $40K Gtd	(Brazil) rpalma21 (Rafael Palma)	$5,763.35	8,548	$83,770.40
14M	$109 NLHE [Progressive KO], $100K Gtd	(Canada) Lefebvre1101	$18,706.90	2,550	$255,000.00
14H	$1,050 NLHE [Progressive KO], $200K Gtd	(Germany) HessKopp	$33,883.74	372	$372,000.00
15L	$5.50 NLHE [Deep Stacks], $50K Gtd	(Brazil) NetoGamboa (Luis Quilcate)	$8,634.93	15,356	$75,244.40
15M	$55 NLHE [Deep Stacks], $200K Gtd	(Romania) ROMcavalier	$39,432.46*	6,333	$316,650.00
15H	$530 NLHE [Deep Stacks], $400K Gtd	(Canada) Nurlux	$88,319.74*	1,153	$576,500.00
16L	$215 PLO [6-Max, High Roller], $200K Gtd	(Finland) miikka84	$44,563.45*	1,648	$329,600.00
16M	$2,100 PLO [6-Max, High Roller], $500K Gtd	(Finland) Erä_Koira (Olli Ikonen)	$150,420.25	415	$830,000.00
16H	$25,000 PLO [6-Max, High Roller], $1M Gtd	(Netherlands) TheCleaner11 (Jorryt van Hoof)	$465,559.91	54	$1,324,350.00
17L	$22 NLHE [Heads Up], $40,960 Gtd	(Brazil) andredos	$8,212.49	3,897	$77,940.00
17M	$215 NLHE [Heads Up], $102,400 Gtd	(Belgium) KingRakker	$23,622.36	781	$156,200.00
17H	$2,100 NLHE [Heads Up], $256K Gtd	(Hungary) omaha4rollz (Laszlo Bujtas)	$76,800.00	128	$256,000.00
18L	$22 HORSE, $30K Gtd	(Thailand) KhunFrangsua	$6,764.10*	2,529	$50,580.00
18M	$215 HORSE, $75K Gtd	(Mexico) sprocketsAA	$17,199.00	455	$91,000.00
18H	$2,100 HORSE, $200K Gtd	(Malta) Ravenswood13 (Carlo van Ravenswoud)	$49,000.00	99	$200,000.00
19L	$109 NLHE [8-Max, Progressive KO], $500K Gtd	(Brazil) dennysramos2	$48,613.40	6,844	$684,400.00
19M	$1,050 NLHE [8-Max, Progressive KO, Thursday Thrill SE], $1M Gtd	(China) lovexiup	$101,049.26	1,293	$1,293,000.00
19H	$10,300 NLHE [8-Max, Progressive KO, High Roller], $1M Gtd	(Mexico) blanconegro (Connor Drinan)	$163,301.14	162	$1,620,000.00
20L	$11 NL 5-Card Draw, $15K Gtd	(Russia) aDrENalin710 (Denis Strebkov)	$3,233.76	2,094	$20,521.20
20M	$109 NL 5-Card Draw, $25K Gtd	(Russia) FONBET_RULIT	$5,477.88*	284	$28,400.00
20H	$1,050 NL 5-Card Draw, $50K Gtd	(Norway) Senkel92 (Tobias Leknes)	$17,100.00	57	$57,000.00
21L	$22 NLHE [4-Max], $100K Gtd	(Brazil) *M@RC0* A	$18,165.57*	8,177	$163,540.00
21M	$215 NLHE [4-Max], $250K Gtd	(Poland) phounderAA	$56,901.32	1,896	$379,200.00
21H	$2,100 NLHE [4-Max], $500K Gtd	(Canada) SinKarma (Elias Gutierrez)	$124,143.98	334	$668,000.00
22L	$11 PLO8 [8-Max], $25K Gtd	(Sweden) AAcrew	$4,098.42*	3,481	$34,113.80
22M	$109 PLO8 [8-Max], $75K Gtd	(Japan) fish_san	$13,744.91	810	$81,000.00
22H	$1,050 PLO8 [8-Max], $150K Gtd	(Mexico) shaundeeb (Shaun Deeb)	$38,088.84	192	$192,000.00
23L	$22 NLHE, $200K Gtd	(Austria) $odomiz$r (Mihaita Constantin)	$30,020.23	11,493	$229,860.00
23M	$215 NLHE, $400K Gtd	(Germany) Flow_Bambow	$55,936.20*	2,278	$455,600.00
23H	$2,100 NLHE, $600K Gtd	(Bulgaria) cocajamb0	$114,243.60	288	$600,000.00
24L	$5.50 NLHE [3-Max, Turbo, Progressive KO, Zoom], $60K Gtd	(Brazil) n00ki5 (Eduardo Carvalho)	$4,667.85	18,651	$91,389.90
24M	$55 NLHE [3-Max, Turbo, Progressive KO, Zoom], $250K Gtd	(Latvia) RovoDice	$24,844.67	6,996	$349,800.00
24H	$530 NLHE [3-Max, Turbo, Progressive KO, Zoom], $500K Gtd	(United Kingdom) la_benjjjjjj	$47,479.59	1,209	$604,500.00
25L	$22 8-Game, $50K Gtd	(Georgia (country)) labirint93	$9,190.26	2,964	$59,280.00
25M	$215 8-Game, $75K Gtd	(Finland) serkku21	$19,722.00	519	$103,800.00
25H	$2,100 8-Game, $250K Gtd	(Russia) aDrENalin710 (Denis Strebkov)	$70,720.00	136	$272,000.00
26L	$5.50+R NLHE, $125K Gtd	(Germany) Laborant	$21,449.38	10,945	$162,944.60
26M	$55+R NLHE, $300K Gtd	(Republic of Ireland) wesko78	$57,810.59	2,811	$395,542.95
26H	$530+R NLHE, $500K Gtd	(Argentina) ramastar88	$101,489.35	404	$563,580.00
27L	$55 PLO [6-Max], $100K Gtd	(United Kingdom) RunGodlike (Benny Glaser)	$18,057.56*	3,312	$165,600.00
27M	$530 PLO [6-Max], $250K Gtd	(Sweden) Lena900 (Niklas Astedt)	$58,228.20	679	$339,500.00
27H	$5,200 PLO [6-Max, High Roller], $500K Gtd	(United Kingdom) tjbentham (Tom Bentham)	$191,476.72	192	$960,000.00
28L	$55 NLHE [8-Max, Turbo], $250K Gtd	(Canada) JBJG44	$43,893.28*	6,469	$323,450.00
28M	$530 NLHE [8-Max, Turbo], $400K Gtd	(United Kingdom) Debilne_Ucho	$78,552.94	961	$480,500.00
28H	$5,200 NLHE [8-Max, Turbo, High Roller], $500K Gtd	(Austria) Tankanza (Gianluca Speranza)	$140,634.59	134	$670,000.00
29L	$11 NLHE [8-Max, Progressive KO], $75K Gtd	(Hungary) need2more	$8,436.47	14,155	$138,719.00
29M	$109 NLHE [8-Max, Progressive KO, Sunday Kickoff SE], $300K Gtd	(Canada) joshuah333	$33,552.36	4,709	$470,900.00
29H	$1,050 NLHE [8-Max, Progressive KO], $600K Gtd	(Belarus) OMGitshunt	$66,223.96	778	$778,000.00
30L	$55 NLHE, $250K Gtd	(Germany) Jumbo1223	$50,432.14	7,102	$355,100.00
30M	$530 NLHE [Sunday Warm-Up SE], $750K Gtd	(Brazil) XxJoaoFeraxX (João Otávio)	$126,350.19*	1,856	$928,000.00
30H	$5,200 NLHE [High Roller], $1M Gtd	(Costa Rica) ImDaNuts (Chris Oliver)	$250,934.90	261	$1,305,000.00
31L	$11 NLHE, $200K Gtd	(Belarus) mars140191	$31,814.71	32,782	$321,263.60
31M	$109 NLHE [Half Price Sunday Million], $1M Gtd	(Lithuania) euras79	$186,467.37	16,950	$1,720,425.00
31H	$1,050 NLHE, $1.5M Gtd	(Brazil) Kovalski1 (Fabiano Kovalski)	$282,545.21*	2,077	$2,077,000.00
32L	$5.50 NLO8 [8-Max], $20K Gtd	(Russia) Premove	$3,662.54	5,246	$25,705.40
32M	$55 NLO8 [8-Max], $50K Gtd	(Finland) D0N H0MER	$11,908.49	1,563	$78,150.00
32H	$530 NLO8 [8-Max], $125K Gtd	(Canada) FU_15	$31,222.05	336	$168,000.00
33L	$22 NLHE [6-Max], $100K Gtd	(Lithuania) ICYapaz	$17,446.95*	6,692	$133,840.00
33M	$215 NLHE [6-Max], $250K Gtd	(United Kingdom) keti140679	$52,578.08	1,741	$348,200.00
33H	$2,100 NLHE [6-Max], $500K Gtd	(Austria) wizowizo (Ole Schemion)	$112,235.51	294	$588,000.00
34L	$11 Stud Hi/Lo, $20K Gtd	(Germany) shoeseller	$4,041.83*	2,752	$26,969.60
34M	$109 Stud Hi/Lo, $50K Gtd	(United Kingdom) iacog4 (Kevin Iacofano)	$11,449.70	610	$61,000.00
34H	$1,050 Stud Hi/Lo, $125K Gtd	(Russia) aDrENalin710 (Denis Strebkov)	$29,145.00	134	$134,000.00
35L	$22 NLHE [8-Max, Progressive KO], $200K Gtd	(Sweden) murvl	$21,516.39	20,822	$416,440.00
35M	$215 NLHE [8-Max, Progressive KO], $600K Gtd	(Romania) Narcisus90	$72,068.37	5,065	$1,013,000.00
35H	$2,100 NLHE [8-Max, Progressive KO], $1M Gtd	(Sweden) compris	$112,580.54	645	$1,290,000.00
36L	$5.50 NLHE/PLO [6-Max], $25K Gtd	(Denmark) Mathias_ø	$4,838.84	6,942	$34,015.80
36M	$55 NLHE/PLO [6-Max], $75K Gtd	(Austria) Gronî	$17,144.52	2,314	$115,700.00
36H	$530 NLHE/PLO [6-Max], $250K Gtd	(Germany) BockRamsch89	$54,779.21	637	$318,500.00
37L	$11 NLHE [Turbo], $50K Gtd	(United Kingdom) bjj_el_nino	$12,591.81	9,297	$91,110.60
37M	$109 NLHE [Turbo], $150K Gtd	(United Kingdom) Amadi_017 (Adrián Mateos)	$40,888.24	2,822	$282,200.00
37H	$1,050 NLHE [Turbo], $300K Gtd	(United Kingdom) simon1471	$98,677.60	559	$559,000.00
38L	$11 NLHE [6-Max, Progressive KO], $75K Gtd	(Romania) Slavitza	$8,653.93	16,460	$161,308.00
38M	$109 NLHE [6-Max, Progressive KO], $200K Gtd	(Brazil) KKremate (Thiago Crema de Macedo)	$29,059.98*	4,775	$477,500.00
38H	$1,050 NLHE [6-Max, Progressive KO], $400K Gtd	(Slovakia) adkaf	$68,406.22	806	$806,000.00
39L	$22 FLHE [6-Max], $30K Gtd	(Sweden) murvl	$4,894.97	1,609	$32,180.00
39M	$215 FLHE [6-Max], $60K Gtd	(Germany) Face333X (Martin Schleich)	$13,701.09	373	$74,701.09
39H	$2,100 FLHE [6-Max], $150K Gtd	(Russia) Mordnilap	$53,055.26	118	$236,000.00
40L	$5.50 NLHE, $75K Gtd	(Brazil) rportaleoni (Rodrigo Garrido Portaleoni)	$11,534.34	22,926	$112,337.40
40M	$55 NLHE, $350K Gtd	(Brazil) hiran bass (Hiran Bass)	$65,360.70	9,575	$478,750.00
40H	$530 NLHE [Half Price Super Tuesday], $1M Gtd	(Malta) WhaTisL0v3	$185,562.31	2,511	$1,268,055.00
41L	$5.50 PLO [4-Max, Progressive KO], $35K Gtd	(Greece) Manwlis45	$2,780.91	8,232	$40,336.80
41M	$55 PLO [4-Max, Progressive KO], $125K Gtd	(Russia) RussiaSurgut	$11,947.47	3,325	$166,250.00
41H	$530 PLO [4-Max, Progressive KO], $300K Gtd	(Germany) lissi stinkt (Christopher Frank)	$27,526.72*	817	$408,500.00
42L	$22 FL Triple Draw 2-7, $25K Gtd	(Poland) pokerqmaster	$4,915.91	1,536	$30,720.00
42M	$215 FL Triple Draw 2-7, $60K Gtd	(Canada) SirWatts (Mike Watson)	$15,325.20	396	$79,200.00
42H	$2,100 FL Triple Draw 2-7, $175K Gtd	(Netherlands) Naza114 (João Vieira)	$49,595.00	91	$182,000.00
43L	$215 NLHE [8-Max, High Roller], $1M Gtd	(Estonia) AS Leshiy	$131,349.41*	5,010	$1,002,000.00
43M	$2,100 NLHE [8-Max, High Roller], $1M Gtd	(Austria) psjebemvas (Ognjen Sekularac)	$228,348.36	662	$1,324,000.00
43H	$25,000 NLHE [8-Max, High Roller], $2M Gtd	(Austria) LLinusLLove (Linus Loeliger)	$587,747.32	104	$2,550,600.00
44L	$22 NLHE [6-Max, Shootout], $75K Gtd	(Canada) Little Kraut	$12,014.08	4,619	$92,380.00
44M	$215 NLHE [6-Max, Shootout], $150K Gtd	(United Kingdom) Jenbizzle (Ben Jones)	$31,425.08	982	$196,400.00
44H	$2,100 NLHE [6-Max, Shootout], $250K Gtd	(Russia) josef_shvejk	$66,000.00	150	$300,000.00
45L	$22 5-Card PLO [6-Max], $50K Gtd	(Costa Rica) SicTheory	$9,713.95	3,378	$67,560.00
45M	$215 5-Card PLO [6-Max], $125K Gtd	(Netherlands) BlackOps02	$32,616.50	998	$199,600.00
45H	$2,100 5-Card PLO [6-Max], $300K Gtd	(Canada) OLD TIME GIN (Matt Stone)	$101,928.19	267	$534,000.00
46L	$5.50 NLHE [Progressive KO], $100K Gtd	(Brazil) Milo GT7	$7,444.14	31,055	$152,169.50
46M	$55 NLHE [Progressive KO], $400K Gtd	(Poland) phounderAA	$43,565.42	14,024	$701,200.00
46H	$530 NLHE [Progressive KO, Half Price Thursday Thrill], $1.25M Gtd	(Mexico) sebasñato	$124,279.77	3,384	$1,708,920.00
47L	$11 HORSE, $25K Gtd	(Russia) WTFOMFGOAO	$5,085.83	3,145	$30,821.00
47M	$109 HORSE, $60K Gtd	(United Kingdom) soumi7	$12,937.50	690	$69,937.50
47H	$1,050 HORSE, $125K Gtd	(Latvia) Colisea (Dzmitry Urbanovich)	$34,365.00	158	$158,000.00
48L	$11 NLHE, $50K Gtd	(Brazil) leandroctbsb	$10,719.17	7,760	$76,048.00
48M	$109 NLHE, $150K Gtd	(Peru) Die Ventura (Diego Ventura)	$30,422.20	2,033	$203,300.00
48H	$1,050 NLHE, $250K Gtd	(Cyprus) Pokerfan89Gr (Aristotelis Tavris)	$59,114.02*	341	$341,000.00
49L	$22 NLHE [Deep Stacks], $100K Gtd	(Brazil) wpwhite-eck	$22,214.77	7,883	$157,660.00
49M	$215 NLHE [Deep Stacks], $200K Gtd	(Belarus) Leqenden (Ilya Anatskiy)	$41,678.28	1,546	$309,200.00
49H	$2,100 NLHE [Deep Stacks], $400K Gtd	(Brazil) great dant (Bruno Volkmann)	$113,251.80	301	$602,000.00
50L	$11 NLHE [8-Max], $125K Gtd	(Czech Republic) Alyz (Aneta Kalíková)	$19,594.45	20,154	$197,509.20
50M	$109 NLHE [8-Max], $350K Gtd	(Brazil) BernardoDG (Bernardo Granato)	$59,070.76*	5,080	$508,000.00
50H	$1,050 NLHE [8-Max], $1M Gtd	(United Kingdom) t4t0PAGAU (Mario Navarro)	$179,214.76	1,125	$1,125,000.00
51L	$22 NLO8 [6-Max, Progressive KO], $50K Gtd	(Finland) villepn	$6,444.07	4,520	$90,400.00
51M	$215 NLO8 [6-Max, Progressive KO], $100K Gtd	(Germany) DSmunichlife	$16,618.97	1,017	$203,400.00
51H	$2,100 NLO8 [6-Max, Progressive KO], $200K Gtd	(Netherlands) onmybicycle	$38,694.35	194	$388,000.00
52L	$5.50+R PLO [6-Max], $50K Gtd	(Hungary) sorcloud666	$6,606.40*	3,432	$56,090.30
52M	$55+R PLO [6-Max], $150K Gtd	(Russia) nafnaf_funny	$26,966.30	881	$161,122.50
52H	$530+R PLO [6-Max], $300K Gtd	(Finland) Aku1206	$83,528.72	220	432,280.00
53L	$22 NLHE [6-Max], $125K Gtd	(Brazil) Money MaikeB (Maicon Vinícius Silva)	$21,669.23*	9,327	$186,540.00
53M	$215 NLHE [6-Max], $300K Gtd	(Finland) babecallme	$51,699.74*	1,888	$377,600.00
53H	$2,100 NLHE [6-Max], $500K Gtd	(Belarus) ANDREIIANN	$112,999.03	296	$592,000.00
54L	$109 8-Game [High Roller], $50K Gtd	(Croatia) Zelja22	$16,616.00	992	$99,200.00
54M	$1,050 8-Game [High Roller], $150K Gtd	(Netherlands) Exclusive (Noah Boeken)	$41,630.00	181	$181,000.00
54H	$10,300 8-Game [High Roller], $750K Gtd	(Latvia) Colisea (Dzmitry Urbanovich)	$225,000.00	71	$750,00.00
55L	$55 NLHE [8-Max, Turbo, Progressive KO], $250K Gtd	(Uruguay) jeanfranco07	$32,620.21	9,477	$473,850.00
55M	$530 NLHE [8-Max, Turbo, Progressive KO], $400K Gtd	(United Kingdom) girafganger7	$52,662.99*	1,456	$728,000.00
55H	$5,200 NLHE [8-Max, Turbo, Progressive KO, High Roller], $500K Gtd	(United Kingdom) Bit2Easy (Luke Reeves)	$99,312.64	203	$1,015,000.00
56L	$5.50 NLHE, $50K Gtd	(Brazil) Igor Girard!	$5,743.78*	13,063	$64,008.70
56M	$55 NLHE [Half Price Sunday Kickoff], $200K Gtd	(United Kingdom) lozzz	$47,493.84	6,619	$334,259.50
56H	$530 NLHE, $500K Gtd	(Switzerland) Xungazz	$106,185.22	1,360	$680,000.00
57L	$22 NLHE [8-Max], $200K Gtd	(Finland) boblert89	$30,041.02*	13,270	$265,400.00
57M	$215 NLHE [8-Max, Sunday Warm-Up SE], $600K Gtd	(United Kingdom) Legadzo (Nicolas Cardyn)	$120,900.63	4,233	$846,600.00
57H	$2,100 NLHE [8-Max], $1M Gtd	(Republic of Ireland) Mr. Tim Caum (Steve O'Dwyer)	$227,100.97	667	$1,334,000.00
58L	$55 NLHE [Main Event], $1M Gtd	(Brazil) wellingtowap	$192,036.92	39,817	$1,990,850.00
58H	$5,200 NLHE [Main Event], $10M Gtd	(Netherlands) wann2play	$1,352,967.97*	2,044	$10,220,000.00
59L	$22 PLO8 [6-Max], $50K Gtd	(United Kingdom) Aces Amin	$11,973.30	4,193	$83,860.00
59M	$215 PLO8 [6-Max], $150K Gtd	(Canada) Egption (Patrick Tardif)	$29,948.84	909	$181,800.00
59H	$215 PLO8 [6-Max], $150K Gtd	(Mexico) shaundeeb (Shaun Deeb)	$69,011.45	173	$346,000.00
60L	$11 NLHE [Turbo, Progressive KO], $125K Gtd	(Bulgaria) Lilita88	$8,687.22	16,408	$160,798.40
60M	$109 NLHE [Turbo, Progressive KO], $500K Gtd	(Brazil) GStronda (Gillian Conrado)	$46,747.02	6,580	$658,000.00
60H	$1,050 NLHE [Turbo, Progressive KO], $1M Gtd	(Sweden) TanTanSWE (Jonatan Hellman)	$84,273.55*	1,264	$1,264,000.00
61L	$11 NLHE [8-Max, Progressive KO], $200K Gtd	(Ukraine) MinimalLove	$13,808.04*	30,573	$299,615.40
61M	$109 NLHE [8-Max, Progressive KO], $600K Gtd	(Taiwan) psxfrcndhe	$67,471.88	9,996	$999,600.00
61H	$1,050 NLHE [8-Max, Progressive KO], $1M Gtd	(Lithuania) dartazzzz (Tomas Jozonis)	$120,281.27	1,577	$1,577,000.00
62L	$215 NLHE [8-Max, High Roller], $500K Gtd	(Austria) WATnlos (Christian Rudolph)	$130,598.18	4,582	$916,400.00
62M	$2,100 NLHE [8-Max, High Roller], $1M Gtd	(Canada) Str8$$$Homey (Sam Greenwood)	$268,775.65	792	$1,584,000.00
62H	$25,000 NLHE [8-Max, High Roller], $1.5M Gtd	(Macau) Iimitless (Wiktor Malinowski)	$725,847.48	141	$3,458,025.00

== 2019 events ==
There were 219 tournaments during WCOOP 2019 including a tie-in with UFC, which awarded winners tickets to a UFC bout in New York.

Tournament	Buy-in	Entries	Prize pool	Winner	Country	Prize
WCOOP-02-L: $109 NLHE [8-Max, Progressive KO, Mini Thursday Thrill SE], $500K Gtd	$109	7,703	$770,300	Daghemuneguu	(Malta)	$83,581.35†
WCOOP-02-M: $1,050 NLHE [8-Max, Progressive KO, Thursday Thrill SE], $1,000,000 Gtd	$1,050	1,246	$1,246,000	mickesch777	(Germany)	$166,039.91†
WCOOP-02-H: $10,300 NLHE [8-Max, Progressive KO, High Roller], $1,000,000 Gtd	$10,300	107	$1,070,000	a.urli	(Canada)	$250,001.48†
WCOOP-03-L: $22 PLO [6-Max], $75K Gtd	$22	5,829	$116,580	TsiTool	Hungary	$16,573.44
WCOOP-03-M: $215 PLO [6-Max], $200K Gtd	$215	1,367	$273,400	bigbadwolfLT	Lithuania	$42,341.38
WCOOP-03-H: $2,100 PLO [6-Max], $400K Gtd	$2,100	298	$596,000	kimokh	Lebanon	$113,762.51
WCOOP-04-L: $5.50 NLHE, $75K Gtd	$5.50	23,192	$113,640	sep_itl1914	Brazil	$11,651.39
WCOOP-04-M: $55 NLHE, $250K Gtd	$55	9,208	$460,400	cautiioN	Brazil	$55,442.23*
WCOOP-04-H: $530 NLHE, $500K Gtd	$530	1,400	$700,000	I'mYourTeddy	Germany	$95,756.97*
WCOOP-05-L: $11 HORSE, $20K Gtd	$11	3,031	$29,704	facper	Poland	$4,466.15*
WCOOP-05-M: $109 HORSE, $50K Gtd	$109	721	$72,100	Mr Negreanu	UK	$13,518.75
WCOOP-05-H: $1,050 HORSE, $100K Gtd	$1,050	157	$157,000	sandman201	Canada	$34,147.50
WCOOP-06-L: $11 NLHE [6-Max, Turbo, Shootout], $40K Gtd	$11	6,743	$68,081	sleepymyr	Norway	$8,596.16
WCOOP-06-M: $109 NLHE [6-Max, Turbo, Shootout], $100K Gtd	$109	1,296	$129,600	Mr.Bittar	Brazil	$20,736.72
WCOOP-06-H: $1,050 NLHE [6-Max, Turbo, Shootout], $200K Gtd	$1,050	216	$216,000	eijseijs	Sweden	$47,520.00
WCOOP-07-L: $5.50 NLHE [8-Max, Afternoon Deep Stack], $50K Gtd	$5.50	13,613	$66,704	Leha1107	Russia	$8,359.73
WCOOP-07-M: $55 NLHE [8-Max, Afternoon Deep Stack], $200K Gtd	$55	5,345	$267,250	J. Gelades	Ukraine	$31,887.97*
WCOOP-07-H: $530 NLHE [8-Max, Afternoon Deep Stack], $300K Gtd	$530	789	$394,500	sksjohny	Czech Republic	$66,298.75
WCOOP-08-L: $11 NLHE [Progressive KO], $150K Gtd	$11	25,531	$250,204	PrOdigYx1	Finland	$14,309.94†*
WCOOP-08-M: $109 NLHE [Progressive KO], $500K Gtd	$109	8,256	$825,600	Virgilik	Romania	$86,305.72†*
WCOOP-08-H: $1,050 NLHE [Progressive KO], $750K Gtd	$1,050	1,002	$1,002,000	DeuceofDuc0	UK	$159,127.96†
WCOOP-09-L: $11 NL 5-Card Draw [Progressive KO], $15K Gtd	$11	2,269	$22,236	MAZAAZAZI	Finland	$2,674.51†
WCOOP-09-M: $109 NL 5-Card Draw [Progressive KO], $25K Gtd	$109	379	$37,900	Pycckui AA	Russia	$6,592.53†*
WCOOP-09-H: $1,050 NL 5-Card Draw [Progressive KO], $50K Gtd	$1,050	70	$70,000	(United States) shaundeeb (Shaun Deeb)	Mexico	$25,375.00†
WCOOP-10-L: $2.20+R NLHE [8-Max, Turbo], $25K Gtd	$2.20	6,638	$37,701	marval231	Argentina	$5,360.16
WCOOP-10-M: $22+R NLHE [8-Max, Turbo], $75K Gtd	$22	2,973	$153,020	Gukiz	Netherlands	$18,350.50*
WCOOP-10-H: $215+R NLHE [8-Max, Turbo], $150K Gtd	$215	557	$286,839	Ti0373	Russia	$50,634.31
WCOOP-11-L: $5.50 NLHE [Progressive KO, Mini Sunday Kickoff SE], $50K Gtd	$5.50	14,180	$69,482	Gustavo_spb	Brazil	$5,849.53†
WCOOP-11-M: $55 NLHE [Progressive KO, Sunday Kickoff SE], $250K Gtd	$55	7,110	$355,500	GoTelesGO	Brazil	$31,285.55†
WCOOP-11-H: $530 NLHE [Progressive KO], $500K Gtd	$530	1,194	$597,000	h280138	China	$91,219.81†
WCOOP-12-L: $11 NLHE [8-Max], $100K Gtd	$11	13,570	$132,986	GhRibeiro	Brazil	$16,644.44
WCOOP-12-M: $109 NLHE [8-Max, Sunday Warm-Up SE], $250K Gtd	$109	4,810	$481,000	Ebaaa11	Russia	$68,478.97
WCOOP-12-H: $1,050 NLHE [8-Max, Sunday Warm-Up SE], $500K Gtd	$1,050	770	$770,000	wisopekeño!	UK	$125,950.29*
WCOOP-13-L: $55 NLHE [Mini Sunday Million SE], $400K Gtd - Right To Play Charity Event	$55	11,275	$563,750	rmullen	Canada	$62,763.77*
WCOOP-13-M: $530 NLHE [Sunday Million SE], $1,000,000 Gtd	$530	2,770	$1,385,000	XMorphineX	Belgium	$202,420.81
WCOOP-13-H: $5,200 NLHE [High Roller], $1,000,000 Gtd	$5,200	272	$1,360,000	imluckbox	Thailand	$258,952.34
WCOOP-14-L: $22 5-Card PLO [6-Max], $50K Gtd	$22	3,301	$66,020	Polarizing-1	Austria	$9,494.11
WCOOP-14-M: $215 5-Card PLO [6-Max], $125K Gtd	$215	847	$169,400	adiprene1	Ireland	$28,351.70
WCOOP-14-H: $2,100 5-Card PLO [6-Max], $300K Gtd	$2,100	220	$440,000	bustoville	Finland	$85,020.30
WCOOP-15-L: $11 NLHE, $50K Gtd	$11	8,057	$78,959	guga 18735	Brazil	$10,179.90*
WCOOP-15-M: $109 NLHE, $200K Gtd	$109	3,222	$322,200	DanielLUCKY	Sweden	$46,419.49
WCOOP-15-H: $1,050 NLHE, $300K Gtd	$1,050	431	$431,000	roo_400	Canada	$77,614.59
WCOOP-16-L: $22 NLHE [8-Max, Turbo, Progressive KO, Mini Sunday Cooldown SE], $100K Gtd	$22	9,762	$195,240	Adamyid	Mexico	$19,443.14†
WCOOP-16-M: $215 NLHE [8-Max, Turbo, Progressive KO, Sunday Cooldown SE], $250K Gtd	$215	2,461	$492,200	v587nt	China	$63,672.90†
WCOOP-16-H: $2,100 NLHE [8-Max, Turbo, Progressive KO, Sunday Cooldown SE], $400K Gtd	$2,100	270	$540,000	mindgamer	Austria	$108,173.43†
WCOOP-17-L: $11 NLHE [Progressive KO], $150K Gtd	$11	23,853	$233,759	guinHuuh	Brazil	$13,323.73
WCOOP-17-M: $109 NLHE [Progressive KO], $500K Gtd	$109	8,416	$841,600	Krafty_lt	Lithuania	$88,290.21
WCOOP-17-H: $1,050 NLHE [Progressive KO], $1,000,000 Gtd	$1,050	1,296	$1,296,000	PaDiLhA SP	Brazil	$192,548.15
WCOOP-18-L: $5.50 NLO8 [8-Max], $20K Gtd	$5.50	4,881	$23,917	snovalshik1	Russia	$3,408.17
WCOOP-18-M: $55 NLO8 [8-Max], $50K Gtd	$55	1,502	$75,100	Zapahzamazki	Russia	$11,523.03
WCOOP-18-H: $530 NLO8 [8-Max], $100K Gtd	$530	329	$164,500	PodKrepkimCh	Russia	$28,451.85
WCOOP-19-L: $5.50 NLHE [4-Max], $40K Gtd	$5.50	9,345	$45,791	anelka79	Russia	$5,594.40
WCOOP-19-M: $55 NLHE [4-Max], $150K Gtd	$55	4,056	$202,800	LeoMattosAK	Brazil	$28,976.17
WCOOP-19-H: $530 NLHE [4-Max], $250K Gtd	$530	767	$383,500	Kovalski1	Brazil	$64,911.73
WCOOP-20-L: $11 NLHE [Progressive KO], $75K Gtd	$11	12,056	$118,149	Jpickering	UK	$9,822.38
WCOOP-20-M: $109 NLHE [Progressive KO], $200K Gtd	$109	4,251	$425,100	dynoalot	Canada	$46,006.75
WCOOP-20-H: $1,050 NLHE [Progressive KO], $300K Gtd	$1,050	536	$536,000	SsicK_OnE	Austria	$98,994.80
WCOOP-21-L: $11 FLHE [6-Max], $15K Gtd	$11	1,748	$17,130	YELLOWEMPIRE	Argentina	$2,591.87
WCOOP-21-M: $109 FLHE [6-Max], $40K Gtd	$109	402	$40,200	destroyalldr	Russia	$7,285.73
WCOOP-21-H: $1,050 FLHE [6-Max], $100K Gtd	$1,050	97	$100,000	RuiNF	Netherlands	$23,896.62
WCOOP-22-L: $55 NLHE [8-Max, Mini Super Tuesday SE], $350K Gtd	$55	9,825	$491,250	shaenny	Brazil	$66,835.21
WCOOP-22-M: $530 NLHE [8-Max, Super Tuesday SE], $1,000,000 Gtd	$530	2,393	$1,196,500	Tomatee	Uruguay	$156,832.32*
WCOOP-22-H: $5,200 NLHE [8-Max, High Roller], $1,000,000 Gtd	$5,200	242	$1,210,000	KaraageChicken	UK	$196,251*
WCOOP-23-L: $11 Razz, $15K Gtd	$11	2,049	$20,080	badidada	Germany	$2,841.91*
WCOOP-23-M: $109 Razz, $40K Gtd	$109	582	$58,200	RunGodlike	UK	$10,924.14
WCOOP-23-H: $1,050 Razz, $75K Gtd	$1,050	104	$104,000	nkeyno	Japan	$25,480.00
WCOOP-24-L: $22 NLHE [6-Max], $100K Gtd	$22	5,803	$116,060	Jefffrr8	Canada	$16,499.58
WCOOP-24-M: $215 NLHE [6-Max], $250K Gtd	$215	1,564	$312,800	LeFaisao	Poland	$43,535.44*
WCOOP-24-H: $2,100 NLHE [6-Max], $400K Gtd	$2,100	319	$638,000	MLS20	Austria	$119,539.24
WCOOP-25-L: $215 NLHE [8-Max, High Roller], $500K Gtd	$215	3,658	$731,600	Aagoodfold	UK	$104,827.00
WCOOP-25-M: $2,100 NLHE [8-Max, High Roller], $1,000,000 Gtd	$2,100	546	$1,092,000	xnrobix	Hungary	$193,067.24
WCOOP-25-H: $25,000 NLHE [8-Max, High Roller], $2,000,000 Gtd	$25,000	90	$2,207,250	Trueteller	Russia	$527,458.43
WCOOP-26-L: $5.50+R PLO [6-Max], $40K Gtd	$5.50	3,175	$51,078	Benyamins	Denmark	$7,356.52
WCOOP-26-M: $55+R PLO [6-Max], $125K Gtd	$55	1,018	$182,145	_pauL€FauL_	Germany	$29,764.44
WCOOP-26-H: $530+R PLO [6-Max], $300K Gtd	$530	232	$449,450	Naza114	Netherlands	$88,846.38
WCOOP-27-L: $11 NLHE, $75K Gtd	$11	7,825	$76,685	19_Kumite_79	Norway	$10,807.66
WCOOP-27-M: $109 NLHE, $250K Gtd	$109	2,768	$276,900	OneH1tWonder	Austria	$40,471.22
WCOOP-27-H: $1,050 NLHE, $400K Gtd	$1,050	438	$438,000	Remi Lebo_10	Ukraine	$78,182.44
WCOOP-28-L: $55 NLHE [Progressive KO, Mini Thursday Thrill SE], $500K Gtd	$55	15,207	$760,350	brunilsks	Brazil	$62,044.50†
WCOOP-28-M: $530 NLHE [Progressive KO, Thursday Thrill SE], $1,000,000 Gtd	$530	2,981	$1,490,500	Zagazaur	Netherlands	$185,467.46†
WCOOP-28-H: $5,200 NLHE [Progressive KO, High Roller], $1,000,000 Gtd	$5,200	262	$1,310,000	WRUUUUM	Finland	$205,127.67†
WCOOP-29-L: $22 PLO8 [6-Max], $40K Gtd	$22	3,032	$60,640	Murkovic	Croatia	$7,621.61*
WCOOP-29-M: $215 PLO8 [6-Max], $100K Gtd	$215	697	$139,400	MAMbl4	Russia	$23,908.95
WCOOP-29-H: $2,100 PLO8 [6-Max], $200K Gtd	$2,100	157	$314,000	Tonimonntana	Germany	$63,642.19
WCOOP-30-L: $22 NLHE [8-Max], $100K Gtd	$22	6,436	$128,720	karet2	Russia	$18,297.13
WCOOP-30-M: $215 NLHE [8-Max], $250K Gtd	$215	1,793	$358,600	Sajanas23	Lithuania	$47,652.81*
WCOOP-30-H: $2,100 NLHE [8-Max], $500K Gtd	$2,100	327	$654,000	GODofHU	UK	$121,542.24
WCOOP-31-L: $11 NLHE, $125K Gtd	$11	16,843	$165,061	denimblodturbo	Germany	$16,917.37*
WCOOP-31-M: $109 NLHE, $250K Gtd	$109	4,049	$404,900	leotoledo96	Brazil	$57,885.92
WCOOP-31-H: $1,050 NLHE, $500K Gtd	$1,050	573	$573,000	bartek901	UK	$101,148.83
WCOOP-32-L: $22 8-Game, $35K Gtd	$22	2,304	$46,080	29dandaman29	Canada	$7,259.01
WCOOP-32-M: $215 8-Game, $60K Gtd	$215	460	$92,000	prepstyle71	Canada	$17,480.00
WCOOP-32-H: $2,100 8-Game, $175K Gtd	$2,100	116	$232,000	rickv17	UK	$60,320.00
WCOOP-33-L: $5.50 NLHE [Heads Up, Turbo, Progressive Total KO, Zoom], $60K Gtd	$5.50	15,149	$74,230	Antiya.Z	Russia	$2,959.83†
WCOOP-33-M: $55 NLHE [Heads Up, Turbo, Progressive Total KO, Zoom], $175K Gtd	$55	5,189	$259,450	pierrec_m	Romania	$15,165†
WCOOP-33-H: $530 NLHE [Heads Up, Turbo, Progressive Total KO, Zoom], $250K Gtd	$530	621	$310,500	botteonpoker	Brazil	$50,283.17†
WCOOP-34-L: $11 NLHE [Afternoon Deep Stack], $100K Gtd	$11	11,476	$112,465	Tomas20LT	Lithuania	$14,694.05
WCOOP-34-M: $109 NLHE [Afternoon Deep Stack], $200K Gtd	$109	2,787	$278,700	Reckoner303	Georgia	$40,733.84
WCOOP-34-H: $1,050 NLHE [Afternoon Deep Stack], $300K Gtd	$1,050	384	$384,000	Kroko-dill	Russia	$69,953.22
WCOOP-35-L: $11 Stud Hi/Lo, $15K Gtd	$11	1,788	$17,522	theguzzler	UK	$1,961.79*
WCOOP-35-M: $109 Stud Hi/Lo, $40K Gtd	$109	460	$46,000	_sennj_	Norway	$8,694.00
WCOOP-35-H: $1,050 Stud Hi/Lo, $100K Gtd	$1,050	91	$100,000	kimokh	Lebanon	$27,250.00
WCOOP-36-L: $5.50 NLHE [8-Max, Progressive KO], $100K Gtd	$5.50	25,829	$126,562	karamba1111	Russia	$8,535.47†
WCOOP-36-M: $55 NLHE [8-Max, Progressive KO], $350K Gtd	$55	11,349	$567,450	ronnieb122	UK	$46,009.84*†
WCOOP-36-H: $530 NLHE [8-Max, Progressive KO, Bounty Builder HR SE], $500K Gtd	$530	1,859	$929,500	BillLewinsky	Netherlands	$128,879.48†
WCOOP-37-L: $55 PLO [6-Max], $125K Gtd	$55	2,352	$125,000	Gabriel1244	Romania	$16,632.16*
WCOOP-37-M: $530 PLO [6-Max], $250K Gtd	$530	599	$299,500	(United States) shaundeeb (Shaun Deeb)	Mexico	$52,371.70
WCOOP-37-H: $5,200 PLO [6-Max, High Roller], $750K Gtd	$5,200	179	$895,000	xnrobix	Hungary	$178,512.19
WCOOP-38-L: $22 NLHE [Turbo], $100K Gtd	$22	6,981	$139,620	firsohn	Brazil	$10,338.16*
WCOOP-38-M: $215 NLHE [Turbo], $200K Gtd	$215	1,384	$276,800	Aziz.Mancha	Brazil	$42,819.04
WCOOP-38-H: $2,100 NLHE [Turbo], $350K Gtd	$2,100	219	$438,000	goleafsgoeh	Canada	$85,476.67
WCOOP-39-L: $11 NLHE [8-Max, Mini Sunday Kickoff SE], $75K Gtd	$11	8,124	$79,615	alenka_p15	Ukraine	$9,560.58*
WCOOP-39-M: $109 NLHE [8-Max, Sunday Kickoff SE], $250K Gtd	$109	2,966	$296,600	Sanderssi	Finland	$42,823.47
WCOOP-39-H: $1,050 NLHE [8-Max], $350K Gtd	$1,050	460	$460,000	merla888	Belgium	$82,452.36
WCOOP-40-L: $22 NLHE, $150K Gtd	$22	9,286	$185,720	miniDanny028	Russia	$25,657.74
WCOOP-40-M: $215 NLHE [Sunday Warm-Up SE], $500K Gtd	$215	2,952	$590,400	geokrinikali	UK	$85,540.27
WCOOP-40-H: $2,100 NLHE [Sunday Warm-Up SE], $750K Gtd	$2,100	435	$870,000	IgorKarkarof	Denmark	$156,669.56
WCOOP-41-Micro [UFC Bantamweight]: $11 NLHE [8-Max, Progressive KO], $200K Gtd	$11	32,820	$321,636	eirowin88	Latvia	$19,865.97†*
WCOOP-41-L [UFC Lightweight]: $109 NLHE [8-Max, Progressive KO], $1,250,000 Gtd	$109	15,129	$1,512,900	stilchuka	Bulgaria	$97,730.07†*
WCOOP-41-M [UFC Middleweight]: $1,050 NLHE [8-Max, Progressive KO], $1,250,000 Gtd	$1,050	2,251	$2,251,000	CRmeImDabou	Malta	$245,958.08†*
WCOOP-41-H [UFC Heavyweight]: $10,300 NLHE [8-Max, Progressive KO], $1,000,000 Gtd	$10,300	165	$1,650,000	Zagazaur	Netherlands	$360,309.54†
WCOOP-42-L: $22 NLO8 [6-Max, Progressive KO], $60K Gtd	$22	3,947	$78,940	su_pop	Russia	$7,382.00†*
WCOOP-42-M: $215 NLO8 [6-Max, Progressive KO], $125K Gtd	$215	841	$168,200	texasilainen	Finland	$23,637.77†
WCOOP-42-H: $2,100 NLO8 [6-Max, Progressive KO], $250K Gtd	$2,100	137	$274,000	bokkie87	Russia	$73,475.45†
WCOOP-43-L: $5.50 NLHE [6-Max], $50K Gtd	$5.50	13,455	$65,930	superhero_18	Moldova	$8,245.91
WCOOP-43-M: $55 NLHE [6-Max], $200K Gtd	$55	7,205	$360,250	Gaul4200	Germany	$44,402.90*
WCOOP-43-H: $530 NLHE [6-Max], $400K Gtd	$530	1,398	$699,000	kleath	Malta	$107,214.84
WCOOP-44-L: $5.50 NLHE [6-Max, Progressive KO], $100K Gtd	$5.50	23,235	$113,852	E6yperoff	Ukraine	$8,003.20†
WCOOP-44-M: $55 NLHE [6-Max, Progressive KO], $300K Gtd	$55	10,461	$523,050	ViTaMoS	Ukraine	$50,009.92†
WCOOP-44-H: $530 NLHE [6-Max, Progressive KO], $500K Gtd	$530	1,771	$885,500	pokerkluka	Netherlands	$123,910.06†
WCOOP-45-L: $11 FL Badugi, $10K Gtd	$11	1,223	$11,985	vanov04	Russia	$2,110.23
WCOOP-45-M: $109 FL Badugi, $25K Gtd	$109	284	$28,400	sandman201	Canada	$5,467.00
WCOOP-45-H: $1,050 FL Badugi, $50K Gtd	$1,050	70	$70,000	calvin7v	Finland	$19,075.00
WCOOP-46-L: $11 NLHE [8-Max, Win the Button], $50K Gtd	$11	8,095	$79,331	nomalice	Serbia	$11,144.02
WCOOP-46-M: $109 NLHE [8-Max, Win the Button], $200K Gtd	$109	2,474	$247,400	texaszanardi	Chile	$36,357.44
WCOOP-46-H: $1,050 NLHE [8-Max, Win the Button], $300K Gtd	$1,050	379	$379,000	despedespi33	UK	$69,281.98
WCOOP-47-L: $5.50 PLO8 [8-Max], $15K Gtd	$5.50	4,142	$20,296	Mr. No way	Norway	$2,902.98
WCOOP-47-M: $55 PLO8 [8-Max], $40K Gtd	$55	1,438	$71,900	myIT4	Russia	$9,454.28*
WCOOP-47-H: $530 PLO8 [8-Max], $100K Gtd	$530	313	$156,500	ThomiDaHomi	Germany	$26,264.25*
WCOOP-48-L: $109 NLHE [Mini Super Tuesday SE], $400K Gtd	$109	4,578	$457,800	flamant.blanc	Netherlands	$65,239.80
WCOOP-48-M: $1,050 NLHE [Super Tuesday SE], $1,000,000 Gtd	$1,050	1,112	$1,112,000	MarToMchat	UK	$178,331.76
WCOOP-48-H: $10,300 NLHE [High Roller], $1,000,000 Gtd	$10,300	175	$1,750,000	mczhang	UK	$352,810.54
WCOOP-49-L: $22 FL 2-7 Triple Draw, $20K Gtd	$22	1,064	$21,280	Denis XXX007	Russia	$3,564.90
WCOOP-49-M: $215 FL 2-7 Triple Draw, $50K Gtd	$215	297	$59,400	Pauli elTopo	Germany	$12,177.00
WCOOP-49-H: $2,100 FL 2-7 Triple Draw, $100K Gtd	$2,100	67	$134,000	Zagazaur	Netherlands	$40,200.00
WCOOP-50-L: $22 NLHE [8-Max, Progressive KO], $100K Gtd	$22	9,224	$184,880	Jujubh	Brazil	$15,197.67†*
WCOOP-50-M: $215 NLHE [8-Max, Progressive KO], $250K Gtd	$215	2,511	$502,200	rickv17	UK	$59,788.22†
WCOOP-50-H: $2,100 NLHE [8-Max, Progressive KO], $400K Gtd	$2,100	326	$652,000	Amadi_017	UK	$130,468.21†
WCOOP-51-L: $11 PLO [6-Max], $40K Gtd	$11	4,414	$43,257	sonnor1707	Germany	$6,173.51
WCOOP-51-M: $109 PLO [6-Max], $100K Gtd	$109	1,617	$161,700	neesam1405	Macau	$20,364.37*
WCOOP-51-H: $1,050 PLO [6-Max], $250K Gtd	$1,050	458	$458,000	shenideda	UK	$81,752.23
WCOOP-52-L: $5.50 NLHE [Midweek Freeze], $50K Gtd	$5.50	10,415	$51,034	sontz88	Romania	$6,826.57
WCOOP-52-M: $55 NLHE [Midweek Freeze], $250K Gtd	$55	5,166	$258,300	jaggalo1231	Czech Republic	$32,452.24*
WCOOP-52-H: $530 NLHE [Midweek Freeze], $500K Gtd	$530	1,064	$532,000	Naza114	UK	$86,876.70
WCOOP-53-L: $11 6+ Hold'em [6-Max], $25K Gtd	$11	2,966	$29,067	cha 1	Ireland	$3,038.21*
WCOOP-53-M: $109 6+ Hold'em [6-Max], $50K Gtd	$109	677	$67,700	LutznButzn	Austria	$11,611.91
WCOOP-53-H: $1,050 6+ Hold'em [6-Max], $100K Gtd	$1,050	178	$178,000	FU_15	Canada	$35,503.07
WCOOP-54-L: $11 NLHE [6-Max, Progressive KO], $75K Gtd	$11	9,344	$91,571	AlexGC1989	Romania	$9,402.94†
WCOOP-54-M: $109 NLHE [6-Max, Progressive KO], $200K Gtd	$109	3,499	$349,900	ImThereNow	UK	$40,364.85†
WCOOP-54-H: $1,050 NLHE [6-Max, Progressive KO], $350K Gtd	$1,050	533	$533,000	HITRII999	Russia	$87,533.72†
WCOOP-55-L: $5.50 NLHE, $50K Gtd	$5.50	9,151	$50,000	Alesxy18	Germany	$6,126.74*
WCOOP-55-M: $55 NLHE, $150K Gtd	$55	4,279	$213,950	STEROIDhulk	Malta	$26,448.04*
WCOOP-55-H: $530 NLHE, $250K Gtd	$530	763	$381,500	NoTilit	Lithuania	$64,481.44
WCOOP-56-L: $11 FLO8 [8-Max], $20K Gtd	$11	2,003	$20,000	grossmasster	Poland	$2,991.49
WCOOP-56-M: $109 FLO8 [8-Max], $50K Gtd	$109	591	$59,100	serkku21	Finland	$10,408.61
WCOOP-56-H: $1,050 FLO8 [8-Max], $100K Gtd	$1,050	142	$142,000	sprocketsAA	Mexico	$29,806.19
WCOOP-57-L: $109 NLHE [8-Max, Progressive KO, Mini Thursday Thrill SE], $500K Gtd	$109	6,497	$649,700	Kazeev S. S.	Russia	$74,416.96†
WCOOP-57-M: $1,050 NLHE [8-Max, Progressive KO, Thursday Thrill SE], $1,000,000 Gtd	$1,050	1,330	$1,330,000	com 157	UK	$195,126.96†
WCOOP-57-H: $10,300 NLHE [8-Max, Progressive KO, High Roller], $1,000,000 Gtd	$10,300	148	$1,480,000	Secret_M0d3	Austria	$371,186.76†
WCOOP-58-L: $22 HORSE, $35K Gtd	$22	1,702	$35,000	700920	Bulgaria	$6,090.00
WCOOP-58-M: $215 HORSE, $60K Gtd	$215	381	$76,200	Muka82	Brazil	$14,478.00
WCOOP-58-H: $2,100 HORSE, $125K Gtd	$2,100	110	$220,000	WTFOMFGOAO	Russia	$53,900.00
WCOOP-59-L: $5.50+R NLHE, $100K Gtd	$5.50	6,444	$100,000	EmptyHouse82	Brazil	$14,208.96
WCOOP-59-M: $55+R NLHE, $300K Gtd	$55	2,361	$355,759	TheZQ	Sweden	$38,525.26*
WCOOP-59-H: $530+R NLHE, $500K Gtd	$530	395	$607,010	€urop€an	Finland	$89,781.97*
WCOOP-60-L: $11 NLO8 [6-Max], $25K Gtd	$11	2,991	$29,312	joe1224	Taiwan	$4,229.70
WCOOP-60-M: $109 NLO8 [6-Max], $75K Gtd	$109	835	$83,500	Pylusha	Russia	$9,770.05*
WCOOP-60-H: $1,050 NLO8 [6-Max], $125K Gtd	$1,050	208	$208,000	woodbine ave	Canada	$40,815.52
WCOOP-61-L: $22 NLHE, $150K Gtd	$22	10,926	$218,520	Madu Ponte	Brazil	$22,718.60*
WCOOP-61-M: $215 NLHE, $300K Gtd	$215	2,297	$459,400	2paac	Sweden	$61,708.07
WCOOP-61-H: $2,100 NLHE, $500K Gtd	$2,100	307	$614,000	CrazyLissy	Russia	$115,509.35
WCOOP-62-L: $11 NL 2-7 Single Draw, $10K Gtd	$11	1,365	$13,377	tammaister	Greece	$1,735.25*
WCOOP-62-M: $109 NL 2-7 Single Draw, $25K Gtd	$109	340	$34,000	Aftret	Norway	$7,055.00
WCOOP-62-H: $1,050 NL 2-7 Single Draw, $75K Gtd	$1,050	104	$104,000	nkeyno	Japan	$27,300.00
WCOOP-63-L: $5.50 NLHE [6-Max, Turbo], $40K Gtd	$5.50	10,284	$50,392	MRDOS77	Armenia	$6,720.69
WCOOP-63-M: $55 NLHE [6-Max, Turbo], $150K Gtd	$55	3,943	$197,150	Xungazz	Croatia	$24,873.01*
WCOOP-63-H: $530 NLHE [6-Max, Turbo], $250K Gtd	$530	659	$329,500	pmahoney22	Mexico	$56,670.83
WCOOP-64-L: $5.50 NLHE [Afternoon Deep Stack], $50K Gtd	$5.50	11,931	$58,462	snirk	Germany	$5,927.07*
WCOOP-64-M: $55 NLHE [Afternoon Deep Stack], $175K Gtd	$55	4,596	$229,800	Sw33ney	UK	$32,737.89
WCOOP-64-H: $530 NLHE [Afternoon Deep Stack], $300K Gtd	$530	747	$373,500	wulfgarrr86	Norway	$64,715.10
WCOOP-65-L: $11 NLHE [8-Max, Progressive KO], $150K Gtd	$11	24,129	$236,464	S3d3m2	Poland	$15,989.80†
WCOOP-65-M: $109 NLHE [8-Max, Progressive KO], $350K Gtd	$109	7,690	$769,000	geokrinikali	UK	$73,230.37†
WCOOP-65-H: $1,050 NLHE [8-Max, Progressive KO], $500K Gtd	$1,050	1,027	$1,027,000	Wildace_hun	Hungary	$156,744.09†
WCOOP-66-L: $109 8-Game, $50K Gtd	$109	836	$83,600	Danijelinho	Sweden	$83,600*
WCOOP-66-M: $1,050 8-Game, $125K Gtd	$1,050	216	$216,000	(Germany) Fresh_oO_D (Jens Lakemeier)	Germany	$47,520
WCOOP-66-H: $10,300 8-Game [High Roller], $500K Gtd	$10,300	80	$800,000	merla888	Belgium	$190,495.39*
WCOOP-67-L: $5.50 NLHE [6-Max, Hyper-Turbo], $50K Gtd	$5.50	11,825	$59,716	druss25	Poland	$6,131.16*
WCOOP-67-M: $55 NLHE [6-Max, Hyper-Turbo], $150K Gtd	$55	4,386	$229,739	MiracleQ	Russia	$32,777.10
WCOOP-67-H: $530 NLHE [6-Max, Hyper-Turbo], $250K Gtd	$530	834	$424,939	(Netherlands) TheCleaner11 (Jorryt van Hoof)	Netherlands	$70,860.30
WCOOP-68-L: $5.50 NLHE [Mini Sunday Kickoff SE], $40K Gtd	$5.50	9,627	$47,172	Mr. Willson82	Czech Republic	$5,075.80*
WCOOP-68-M: $55 NLHE [Sunday Kickoff SE], $200K Gtd	$55	5,398	$269,900	TakiToRivers	UK	$38,380.07
WCOOP-68-H: $530 NLHE, $500K Gtd	$530	1,155	$577,500	jantjevAdam*	Netherlands	$81,902.96
WCOOP-69-L: $11 NLHE [8-Max, Progressive KO], $125K Gtd	$11	18,717	$183,427	nicusordej	Romania	$13,015.72†
WCOOP-69-M: $109 NLHE [8-Max, Progressive KO, Sunday Warm-Up SE], $500K Gtd	$109	8,462	$846,200	svquit	Russia	$78,711.54†*
WCOOP-69-H: $1,050 NLHE [8-Max, Progressive KO, Sunday Warm-Up SE], $750K Gtd	$1,050	1,425	$1,425,000	VeGeTTo89	UK	$188,469.86†
WCOOP-70-L: $55 NLHE [8-Max, NLHE Main Event], $1,250,000 Gtd	$55	37,065	$1,853,250	Jesseonboss	Finland	$130,035.12*
WCOOP-70-H: $5,200 NLHE [8-Max, NLHE Main Event], $10,000,000 Gtd	$5,200	2,236	$11,180,000	BigBlindBets	UK	$1,665,962.04
WCOOP-01-L: $2.20 NLHE [Phase 2], $250K Gtd	$2.20	129,080	$252,997	bigmeck1958	Luxembourg	$18,304.33*
WCOOP-01-M: $22 NLHE [Phase 2], $1,000,000 Gtd	$22	56,650	$1,133,000	marthijn_own	Netherlands	$100,034.96
WCOOP-01-H: $215 NLHE [Phase 2], $2,000,000 Gtd	$215	11,254	$2,250,800	Rens02	Netherlands	$189,829.64*
WCOOP-71-L: $109 PLO [6-Max, PLO Main Event], $300K Gtd	$109	4,041	$404,100	Fruble	Brazil	$57,730.54
WCOOP-71-M: $1,050 PLO [6-Max, PLO Main Event], $600K Gtd	$1,050	916	$916,000	skattefar	Denmark	$150,894.28
WCOOP-71-H: $10,300 PLO [6-Max, PLO Main Event], $1,000,000 Gtd	$10,300	193	$1,930,000	Naza114	UK	$384,947.88
WCOOP-72-L: $11 NLHE [8-Max, Turbo, Progressive KO, Mini Sunday Cooldown SE], $100K Gtd	$11	14,368	$140,806	SryIGotOdds	Romania	$13,041.18†
WCOOP-72-M: $109 NLHE [8-Max, Turbo, Progressive KO, Sunday Cooldown SE], $500K Gtd	$109	6,212	$621,200	silskyer	Netherlands	$67,338.08†
WCOOP-72-H: $1,050 NLHE [8-Max, Turbo, Progressive KO, Sunday Cooldown SE], $750K Gtd	$1,050	1,041	$1,041,000	dlanger610 (Doug Lang)	Canada	$168,729.52†
WCOOP-73-L: $11 NLHE [8-Max, Progressive KO, Series Saver], $200K Gtd	$11	25,238	$247,332	seriousziggy	Belgium	$17,235.90†
WCOOP-73-M: $109 NLHE [8-Max, Progressive KO, Series Saver], $500K Gtd	$109	9,565	$956,500	teruliro	Brazil	$92,286.68†
WCOOP-73-H: $1,050 NLHE [8-Max, Progressive KO, Series Saver], $1,000,000 Gtd	$1,050	1,664	$1,664,000	jucetoor18	Mexico	$216,652.68†

†including bounties

- denotes deal

== 2020 events ==
Tournament	Buy-in	Entries	Prize pool	Winner	Country	Prize
01-L	$2.20 NLHE Phase 2	123,400	$250,000	timaozanho	Brazil	$25,051.42
01-M	$22 NLHE Phase 2	50,659	$1,013,180	JannikB541	Germany	$92,664.56
01-H	$215 NLHE Phase 2	10,766	$2,153,200	estebangocu	Uruguay	$215,006.07
02-L	$109 NLHE 8-Max, PKO, Sunday Slam	19,397	$1,939,700	SoEzForMe	Ukraine	$121,618.85
02-M	$1,050 NLHE 8-Max, PKO, Sunday Slam	1,971	$2,000,000	Zapahzamazki	Russia	$175,586.21
02-H	$10,300 NLHE 8-Max, PKO, Sunday Slam	136	$1,500,000	KuuL	Bulgaria	$400,494.59
03-L	$55 PLO 6-Max	3,013	$150,650	icandodge22	Finland	$19,358.63
03-M	$530 PLO 6-Max	544	$272,000	URMYLeNoR	Germany	$48,124.48
03-H	$5,200 PLO 6-Max, High Roller	127	$750,000	dantegoyaF	Brazil	$168,607.68
04-L	$22 NLHE	10,153	$203,060	LosJ&B	Argentina	$15,803.33
04-M	$215 NLHE	2,269	$453,800	juanbonber	Uruguay	$40,220.30
04-H	$2,100 NLHE	241	$500,000	DingeBrinker	Estonia	$96,143.50
05-L	$5.50 NLHE 8-Max, Turbo, PKO, Mini Sunday Cooldown SE	12,192	$59,741	Spraggy	UK	$4,349.41
05-M	$55 NLHE 8-Max, Turbo, PKO, Sunday Cooldown SE	6,906	$345,300	Marksman M	UK	$29,379.96
05-H	$530 NLHE 8-Max, Turbo, PKO, Sunday Cooldown SE	1,091	$545,500	Erictsai7153	Taiwan	$76,372.41
06-L	$5.50 NLHE 6-Max, PKO	25,922	$127,018	jsberta	Argentina	$7,613.47
06-M	$55 NLHE 6-Max, PKO	11,28	$564,000	iBreakU_U	Russia	$44,682.66
06-H	$530 NLHE 6-Max, PKO	1,499	$749,500	SoulRead93	Romania	$87,417.11
07-L	$22 PLO8 6-Max	2,848	$56,960	bryn12	UK	$8,247.68
07-M	$215 PLO8 6-Max	641	$128,200	Kaggis	Norway	$21,988.22
07-H	$2,100 PLO8 6-Max	109	$218,000	Juicy_J_93	Canada	$50,910.06
08-L	$11 NLHE 8-Max	12,068	$118,266	mixtver	Russia	$12,700.46
08-M	$109 NLHE 8-Max	3,218	$321,800	mamba307	Slovenia	$33,365.84
08-H	$1,050 NLHE 8-Max	314	$314,000	ilir3	Canada	$59,071.69
09-L	$11 NL 2-7 Single Draw	1,819	$17,826	Senkel92	Norway	$2,447.75
09-M	$109 NL 2-7 Single Draw	331	$33,100	Codfish60	UK	$6,951.00
09-H	$1,050 NL 2-7 Single Draw	74	$75,000	theNERDguy	Brazil	$21,937.50
10-L	$109 NLHE 8-Max, Mini Super Tuesday SE	4,424	$442,400	Lg#born2win	Brazil	$63,102.45
10-M	$1,050 NLHE 8-Max, Super Tuesday SE	957	$1,000,000	ImDaNuts	Costa Rica	$149,968.28
10-H	$10,300 NLHE 8-Max, High Roller	94	$1,000,000	ludovi333	UK	$238,966.30
11-L	$11 FLHE 6-Max	2,815	$27,587	rastafari898	Germany	$3,204.28
11-M	$109 FLHE 6-Max	416	$41,600	pycadasgalax	Brazil	$7,539.46
11-H	$1,050 FLHE 6-Max	85	$85,000	Exclusive	Netherlands	$20,312.17
12-L	$5.50 NLHE Heads-Up, Progressive Total KO	15,861	$77,719	VIWNIA	Russia	$2,731.41
12-M	$55 NLHE Heads-Up, Progressive Total KO	5,014	$250,700	Flying Smile	Russia	$13,627.70
12-H	$530 NLHE Heads-Up, Progressive Total KO	526	$263,000	pistons87	Canada	$40,792.90
13-L	$11 NLHE Midweek Freeze	12,953	$126,939	ZNOXYU	Latvia	$14,215.90
13-M	$109 NLHE Midweek Freeze	3,507	$350,700	Tayguera	Brazil	$50,392.37
13-H	$1,050 NLHE Midweek Freeze	452	$452,000	josef_shvejk	UK	$72,758.88
14-L	$11 PLO 6-Max	5,587	$54,753	RrrrStyle	Belarus	$6,755.75
14-M	$109 PLO 6-Max	1,786	$178,600	The_Truht	Ukraine	$26,969.46
14-H	$1,050 PLO 6-Max	362	$362,000	Bagrovui	Russia	$66,449.74
15-L	$5.50+R NLHE 8-Max	8,873	$115,488	Janis_x97	Germany	$10,336.26
15-M	$55+R NLHE 8-Max	2,499	$336,004	MathCamillo1	Brazil	$38,834.16
15-H	$530+R NLHE 8-Max	294	$420,160	probirs (Andras Nemeth)	Hungary	$79,655.48
16-L	$109 NLHE 8-Max, PKO, Mini Thursday Thrill SE	6,711	$671,100	herves01	Jersey	$64,806.60
16-M	$1,050 NLHE 8-Max, PKO, Thursday Thrill SE	1,048	$1,048,000	IHackedRNG	Serbia	$145,278.01
16-H	$10,300 NLHE 8-Max, PKO, High Roller	95	$1,000,000	LeslieGroves	Russia	$263,627.99
17-L	$11 6+ Hold'em 6-Max	4,474	$43,845	nikolakiev123	UK	$4,635.14
17-M	$109 6+ Hold'em 6-Max	557	$55,700	nokeee	Bosnia & Herzegovina	$9,825.96
17-H	$1,050 6+ Hold'em 6-Max	119	$119,000	prot0	Malta	$26,752.48
18-L	$22 NLHE	7,739	$154,780	humpster76	Ireland	$18,822.07
18-M	$215 NLHE	1,606	$321,200	MarcGregor89	UK	$48,814.66
18-H	$2,100 NLHE	194	$400,000	brandon0903	UK	$80,642.40
19-L	$5.50 NLHE Afternoon Deep Stack	14,29	$70,021	PetitePutin669	Poland	$7,777.66
19-M	$55 NLHE Afternoon Deep Stack	4,829	$241,450	armadajp	Canada	$34,367.24
19-H	$530 NLHE Afternoon Deep Stack	642	$321,000	cube.com	Germany	$55,618.76
20-L	$11 HORSE	3,128	$30,654	aleksandrs10	Latvia	$4,433.53
20-M	$109 HORSE	689	$68,900	Wall131TCI-I	Germany	$12,918.75
20-H	$1,050 HORSE	127	$127,000	theNERDguy	Brazil	$31,115.00
21-L	$55 NLHE 6-Max, PKO	10,692	$534,600	hassan77	Norway	$44,317.40
21-M	$530 NLHE 6-Max, PKO	1,424	$712,000	va1umart	Canada	$79,767.33
21-H	$5,200 NLHE 6-Max, PKO	108	$540,000	prebz	UK	$140,110.31
22-L	$11 NL 5-Card Draw	311	$18,640	Philych_085	Belarus	$2,033.50
22-M	$109 NL 5-Card Draw	267	$26,700	Muka82	Brazil	$5,146.86
22-H	$1,050 NL 5-Card Draw	48	$50,000	salamandryko	Peru	$19,617.65
23-L	$5.50 NLHE Mini Sunday Kickoff SE	10,155	$49,760	Almi87	Austria	$6,655.28
23-M	$55 NLHE Sunday Kickoff SE	4,886	$244,300	gustavo956	Brazil	$27,883.69
23-H	$530 NLHE	859	$429,500	ludako123	Bulgaria	$72,594.23
24-L	$11 NLHE 8-Max, PKO	18,502	$181,320	1_Stamf0rd	Russia	$12,019.33
24-M	$109 NLHE 8-Max, PKO, Sunday Warm-Up SE	6,441	$644,100	serrazina11	Malta	$61,102.01
24-H	$1,050 NLHE 8-Max, PKO, Sunday Warm-Up SE	789	$789,000	jvieiradias8	Luxembourg	$127,837.44
25-L	$215 NLHE 8-Max, Sunday Slam	7,177	$1,435,400	MpZancan	Brazil	$182,592.53
25-M	$2,100 NLHE 8-Max, Sunday Slam	671	$1,342,000	NoTilit	Lithuania	$228,462.96
25-H	$25,000 NLHE 8-Max, Super High Roller Sunday Slam	106	$2,599,650	Amadi_017	UK	$543,685.63
26-L	$22 5-Card PLO 6-Max	3,13	$62,600	h3pp4p01k4	Finland	$9,031.03
26-M	$215 5-Card PLO 6-Max	767	$153,400	Kressty	Russia	$19,793.69
26-H	$2,100 5-Card PLO 6-Max	156	$312,000	gavz101	UK	$63,236.85
27-L	$11 NLHE	10,306	$100,999	tuliodutra96	Brazil	$13,493.11
27-M	$109 NLHE	3,752	$375,200	jonespkr	Brazil	$48,616.07
27-H	$1,050 NLHE	438	$438,000	caIcuIer_	UK	$78,182.44
28-L	$22 NLHE 8-Max, Turbo, PKO, Mini Sunday Cooldown SE	9,757	$195,140	LuckyDupe	Netherlands	$15,885.61
28-M	$215 NLHE 8-Max, Turbo, PKO, Sunday Cooldown SE	2,431	$486,200	doulas12	Netherlands	$48,742.70
28-H	$2,100 NLHE 8-Max, Turbo, PKO, Sunday Cooldown SE	201	$402,000	Amadi_017	UK	$80,211.93
29-L	$11 NLHE PKO	25,363	$248,557	Gagarinec1	Russia	$15,661.19
29-M	$109 NLHE PKO	7,663	$766,300	Schildy1984	Austria	$66,520.83
29-H	$1,050 NLHE PKO	897	$897,000	YacuTTi	Russia	$129,071.97
30-L	$5.50 NLO8 6-Max	5,089	$24,936	StillGrim420	UK	$2,042.80
30-M	$55 NLO8 6-Max	1,491	$74,550	Turok11-S	Russia	$11,374.01
30-H	$530 NLO8 6-Max	303	$151,500	recusant_89	Russia	$28,917.97
31-L	$5.50 NLHE 4-Max	10,478	$51,342	SergeBD	Russia	$6,837.07
31-M	$55 NLHE 4-Max	3,932	$196,600	doungara	Greece	$22,658.88
31-H	$530 NLHE 4-Max	630	$315,000	papan9_p$	Russia	$54,378.13
32-L	$11 NLHE PKO	11,029	$108,084	Bellsprout6	UK	$8,400.40
32-M	$109 NLHE PKO	3,437	$343,700	neto gol	Brazil	$33,041.11
32-H	$1,050 NLHE PKO	410	$410,000	Loks82	Germany	$61,359.08
33-L	$55 NLHE 8-Max, Mini Super Tuesday SE	8,961	$448,050	Stakelis24	Lithuania	$62,359.17
33-M	$530 NLHE 8-Max, Super Tuesday SE	1,52	$760,000	serggorelyi7	Russia	$115,798.61
33-H	$5,200 NLHE 8-Max, High Roller	83	$775,000	1_conor_b_1	UK	$162,674.33
34-L	$22 8-Game	2,214	$44,280	4Kings_Hit	UK	$6,598.53
34-M	$215 8-Game	460	$92,000	Exclusive	Netherlands	$16,471.59
34-H	$2,100 8-Game	89	$178,000	Colisea	Latvia	$42,536.01
35-L	$22 NLHE 6-Max	5,594	$111,880	blebelea	Romania	$15,909.90
35-M	$215 NLHE 6-Max	1,303	$260,600	luk9r	Austria	$40,722.71
35-H	$2,100 NLHE 6-Max	186	$400,000	Wildace_hun	Hungary	$79,781.92
36-L	$22 NLHE Midweek Freeze	8,622	$172,440	Wizard1998	Netherlands	$24,197.89
36-M	$215 NLHE Midweek Freeze	1,628	$325,600	Samuel Peace	Canada	$44,219.16
36-H	$2,100 NLHE Midweek Freeze	192	$400,000	botteonpoker	Brazil	$80,642.40
37-L	$55 PLO 6-Max	2,268	$113,400	JAG3053	Germany	$14,594.25
37-M	$530 PLO 6-Max	493	$246,500	The_Truht	Ukraine	$38,971.87
37-H	$5,200 PLO 6-Max, High Roller	125	$625,000	probirs (Andras Nemeth)	Hungary	$140,506.41
38-L	$11 NLHE	7,914	$77,557	Sox[tyol]	Ukraine	$8,338.96
38-M	$109 NLHE	2,311	$231,100	NutsInMacadá	Monaco	$30,792.89
38-H	$1,050 NLHE	287	$300,000	silskyer	Netherlands	$57,121.80
39-L	$55 NLHE PKO, Mini Thursday Thrill SE	13,827	$691,350	jokkers_br	Brazil	$54,603.22
39-M	$530 NLHE PKO, Thursday Thrill SE	2,327	$1,163,500	varabey1991	Ukraine	$107,423.22
39-H	$5,200 NLHE PKO, High Roller	173	$1,000,000	Lena900	Sweden	$201,054.85
40-L	$11 Razz	2,288	$22,422	kaskaders	Poland	$3,813.54
40-M	$109 Razz	549	$54,900	Supermassa1	Finland	$8,440.60
40-H	$1,050 Razz	112	$112,000	Gigaloff	Russia	$27,440.00
41-L	$22 NLHE 6-Max	5,805	$116,100	paila02	Argentina	$14,708.75
41-M	$215 NLHE 6-Max	1,29	$258,000	ILoveScarfGuy	Croatia	$40,316.26
41-H	$2,100 NLHE 6-Max	216	$432,000	SamSquid	UK	$84,770.52
42-L	$11 NLHE 8-Max, PKO, Afternoon Deep Stack	13,809	$135,328	rosko58	UK	$9,272.99
42-M	$109 NLHE 8-Max, PKO, Afternoon Deep Stack	3,539	$353,900	Chester20o	Poland	$36,827.76
42-H	$1,050 NLHE 8-Max, PKO, Afternoon Deep Stack	362	$362,000	deivid29	UK	$66,184.32
43-L	$5.50 NLHE/PLO 6-Max	5,379	$26,357	Eiso3	Austria	$3,198.42
43-M	$55 NLHE/PLO 6-Max	1,587	$79,350	SKB1908	Norway	$12,063.97
43-H	$530 NLHE/PLO 6-Max	298	$149,000	lissi stinkt	Germany	$28,440.74
44-L	$22 NLHE	11,412	$228,240	Care_Teddy	Netherlands	$29,811.98
44-M	$215 NLHE	1,93	$386,000	pycadasgalax	Brazil	$58,026.44
44-H	$2,100 NLHE	192	$400,000	Lena900	Sweden	$80,642.40
45-L	$11 FL Badugi 6-Max	1,321	$12,946	Senkel92	Norway	$2,015.43
45-M	$109 FL Badugi 6-Max	315	$31,500	mixjuice	Japan	$5,911.25
45-H	$1,050 FL Badugi 6-Max	65	$65,000	raidalot	UK	$22,850.02
46-L	$11 NLHE 8-Max, Mini Sunday Kickoff SE	7,528	$73,774	13georgiev13	Bulgaria	$7,552.86
46-M	$109 NLHE 8-Max, Sunday Kickoff SE	2,522	$252,200	Muka82	Brazil	$36,930.00
46-H	$1,050 NLHE 8-Max	368	$368,000	Corback_fr	UK	$60,232.70
47-L	$22 NLHE	8,986	$179,720	leoleo05	Brazil	$25,112.37
47-M	$215 NLHE Sunday Warm-Up SE	2,521	$504,200	topetersons	Brazil	$73,970.80
47-H	$2,100 NLHE Sunday Warm-Up SE	258	$516,000	girafganger7	UK	$99,311.22
48-L	$55 NLHE 8-Max, PKO, Sunday Slam	23,459	$1,172,950	dantegoyaF	Brazil	$80,550.25
48-M	$530 NLHE 8-Max, PKO, Sunday Slam	3,856	$1,928,000	Vitorbrasil	Brazil	$210,236.64
48-H	$5,200 NLHE 8-Max, PKO, Sunday Slam	267	$1,335,000	theNERDguy	Brazil	$245,535.01
49-L	$22 NLO8 6-Max, PKO	3,901	$78,020	labirint93	Georgia	$8,562.52
49-M	$215 NLO8 6-Max, PKO	793	$158,600	Senkel92	Norway	$23,963.46
49-H	$2,100 NLO8 6-Max, PKO	123	$246,000	FONBET_RULIT	Russia	$66,714.22
50-L	$11 NLHE 6-Max	14,052	$137,710	gustavix320	Brazil	$17,099.87
50-M	$109 NLHE 6-Max	4,213	$421,300	Marrakesz	Poland	$60,160.24
50-H	$1,050 NLHE 6-Max	677	$677,000	deivid29	UK	$116,437.26
51-L	$5.50 NLHE 8-Max, Turbo, PKO, Mini Sunday Cooldown SE	11,789	$57,766	RafadeMello	Brazil	$4,933.35
51-M	$55 NLHE 8-Max, Turbo, PKO, Sunday Cooldown SE	6,287	$314,350	Tcheleee	Brazil	$31,921.27
51-H	$530 NLHE 8-Max, Turbo, PKO, Sunday Cooldown SE	1,046	$523,000	RRagazzo	Brazil	$64,027.97
52-L	$5.50 NLHE 6-Max, PKO	22,967	$112,538	GALENIA	Russia	$7,666.07
52-M	$55 NLHE 6-Max, PKO	9,053	$452,650	ginolatino33	Germany	$42,199.37
52-H	$530 NLHE 6-Max, PKO	1,321	$660,500	poker@luffyD	Latvia	$76,946.38
53-L	$5.50 PLO8 8-Max	4,502	$22,060	1bloodflood	Russia	$3,147.00
53-M	$55 PLO8 8-Max	1,465	$73,250	Wall131TCI-I	Germany	$11,239.19
53-H	$530 PLO8 8-Max	365	$182,500	IExPlayI	Russia	$33,236.59
54-L	$11 NLHE 8-Max, Win the Button	6,829	$66,924	markovitsus	Estonia	$9,514.48
54-M	$109 NLHE 8-Max, Win the Button	2,045	$204,500	ghkvbb	UK	$30,596.38
54-H	$1,050 NLHE 8-Max, Win the Button	274	$274,000	papan9_p$	Russia	$52,284.18
55-L	$22 HORSE	1,902	$38,040	B--rabbit444	Norway	$6,581.94
55-M	$215 HORSE	379	$75,800	Dorination	Hungary	$12,668.09
55-H	$2,100 HORSE	79	$158,000	Rungodlike	UK	$43,055.00
56-L	$22 NLHE 8-Max	7,901	$158,020	renan141084	Brazil	$22,292.14
56-M	$215 NLHE 8-Max, Mini Super Tuesday SE	2,069	$413,800	TheVirus217	Ireland	$61,739.99
56-H	$2,100 NLHE 8-Max, Super Tuesday SE	386	$772,000	random_chu	Canada	$140,594.83
57-L	$22 FL 2-7 Triple Draw	1,076	$21,520	luda555	Russia	$3,021.05
57-M	$215 FL 2-7 Triple Draw	317	$63,400	Zapahzamazki	Russia	$11,897.29
57-H	$2,100 FL 2-7 Triple Draw	68	$136,000	flong78	UK	$37,707.74
58-L	$5.50 NLHE 8-Max, PKO	11,549	$56,590	NightGuiden	Russia	$4,508.81
58-M	$55 NLHE 8-Max, PKO	5,609	$280,450	valdemaar74	Russia	$27,125.35
58-H	$530 NLHE 8-Max, PKO	842	$421,000	tonkaaaa	Canada	$51,168.46
59-L	$55 NLHE 8-Max, Midweek Freeze	4,825	$241,250	frost3ggg	Russia	$34,356.57
59-M	$530 NLHE 8-Max, Midweek Freeze	811	$405,500	Her087	Germany	$60,676.70
59-H	$5,200 NLHE 8-Max, Midweek Freeze	97	$500,000	Kovalski1	Brazil	$119,483.15
60-L	$5.50+R PLO 6-Max	2,641	$40,337	oyarzun2010	Chile	$5,899.13
60-M	$55+R PLO 6-Max	788	$131,660	calvin7v	Finland	$22,363.15
60-H	$530+R PLO 6-Max	184	$331,280	Sintoras	Germany	$56,608.50
61-L	$11 NLHE 6-Max, PKO	10,119	$99,166	BaNaN4oo	Bulgaria	$7,242.67
61-M	$109 NLHE 6-Max, PKO	3,403	$340,300	theomatador	Brazil	$27,381.73
61-H	$1,050 NLHE 6-Max, PKO	418	$418,000	Pappe_Ruk	Netherlands	$68,096.60
62-L	$11 Stud Hi/Lo	1,869	$18,316	MoreVon	Denmark	$2,398.81
62-M	$109 Stud Hi/Lo	560	$56,000	Schmitzen	Germany	$10,528.00
62-H	$1,050 Stud Hi/Lo	101	$101,000	Kroko-dill	Russia	$24,745.00
63-L	$22 NLHE 8-Max, PKO	12,511	$250,220	nvp.frv	Bulgaria	$20,964.55
63-M	$215 NLHE 8-Max, PKO, Mini Thursday Thrill SE	3,092	$618,400	daltonhb	Brazil	$69,902.98
63-H	$2,100 NLHE 8-Max, PKO, Thursday Thrill SE	494	$988,000	luelue399	Canada	$171,300.02
64-L	$11 FLO8 8-Max	1,827	$17,905	Sqwadr	Russia	$2,270.62
64-M	$109 FLO8 8-Max	486	$48,600	Speck ftw	Germany	$8,639.70
64-H	$1,050 FLO8 8-Max	147	$147,000	XD89lol<3	Finland	$30,855.69
65-L	$11 NLHE 6-Max	7,116	$69,737	stilchuka	Bulgaria	$7,958.84
65-M	$109 NLHE 6-Max	2,108	$210,800	Caldini00	UK	$25,671.60
65-H	$1,050 NLHE 6-Max	408	$408,000	markovitsus	Estonia	$73,643.15
66-L	$5.50 NLHE Afternoon Deep Stack	11,375	$55,738	Super7Sunday	Russia	$5,884.79
66-M	$55 NLHE Afternoon Deep Stack	4,295	$214,750	diego_1901	Peru	$26,947.19
66-H	$530 NLHE Afternoon Deep Stack	609	$304,500	NastyMinder	Austria	$48,197.37
67-L	$11 NLO8 8-Max	2,765	$27,097	texasilainen	Finland	$3,936.91
67-M	$109 NLO8 8-Max	770	$77,000	trollringen	Norway	$13,065.93
67-H	$1,050 NLO8 8-Max	178	$178,000	Premove	Russia	$35,886.02
68-L	$11 NLHE 8-Max, PKO	24,45	$239,610	MarioDutraJR	Brazil	$11,555.41
68-M	$109 NLHE 8-Max, PKO	7,285	$728,500	Roche9797	UK	$62,507.66
68-H	$1,050 NLHE 8-Max, PKO, $600K Gtd	860	$860,000	Fold Machiii	UK	$122,064.56
69-L	$109 8-Game	841	$84,100	giuliano5156	Germany	$13,993.03
69-M	$1,050 8-Game	135	$150,000	calvin7v	Finland	$31,642.70
69-H	$10,300 8-Game High Roller	67	$670,000	RaúlGonzalez	Germany	$235,530.76
70-L	$5.50 NLHE Mini Sunday Kickoff SE	8,659	$42,429	Aand river..	Latvia	$5,959.35
70-M	$55 NLHE Sunday Kickoff SE	4,417	$220,850	bcostin993	Romania	$29,943.35
70-H	$530 NLHE	972	$486,000	Rragazzo	Brazil	$80,082.59
71-L	$11 NLHE 8-Max, PKO	16,542	$162,112	stipinas666	Lithuania	$11,217.67
71-M	$109 NLHE 8-Max, PKO, Sunday Warm-Up SE	6,828	$682,800	powerpokerBR	Brazil	$63,731.36
71-H	$1,050 NLHE 8-Max, PKO, Sunday Warm-Up SE	1,185	$1,185,000	utreg	Netherlands	$165,433.38
72-L	$55 NLHE 8-Max, NLHE Main Event	38,66	$1,933,000	klimono	Poland	$186,841.09
72-M	$530 NLHE 8-Max, NLHE Main Event	7,105	$3,552,500	1mSoWeeeaK	Thailand	$504,583.85
72-H	$5,200 NLHE 8-Max, NLHE Main Event	1,977	$10,000,000	PTFisherman23	Netherlands	$1,147,270.86
73-L	$109 PLO 6-Max, PLO Main Event	3,066	$306,600	nilsef	Germany	$40,224.38
73-M	$1,050 PLO 6-Max, PLO Main Event	739	$750,000	ROFLshove	UK	$133,757.00
73-H	$10,300 PLO 6-Max, PLO Main Event	123	$1,250,000	jedimaster82	Sweden	$283,368.15
74-L	$11 NLHE 8-Max, Turbo, PKO, Mini Sunday Cooldown SE	11,761	$115,258	BrunoBezerr4	Brazil	$8,970.86
74-M	$109 NLHE 8-Max, Turbo, PKO, Sunday Cooldown SE	4,828	$482,800	TonyGPT	Croatia	$51,958.83
74-H	$1,050 NLHE 8-Max, Turbo, PKO, Sunday Cooldown SE	803	$803,000	MITS 304	Netherlands	$108,816.44
75-L	$11 NLHE 8-Max, PKO, Series Saver	28,031	$247,704	Kungurcew	Russia	$17,459.90
75-M	$109 NLHE 8-Max, PKO, Series Saver, $600K Gtd	9,838	$983,800	r-w patriot	Russia	$83,661.79
75-H	$1,050 NLHE 8-Max, PKO, Series Saver	1,49	$1,490,000	Roche9797	UK	$171,803.37

== WCOOP Challenge Series ==
=== Challenge Series 1 (2013) ===
Date	Time (ET)	Event #	Event	Winner	Prize	Entries	Prize pool	Elapsed time
Dec 20	13:00	Challenge 1	$109 NLHE	(Sweden) TiltMeHarder	$124,924.92	8,328	$832,800.00	11 h 35 min
Dec 20	17:00	Challenge 2	$215+R NLHE [Turbo]	(Poland) Sphinx87	$131,845.00	1,800	$1,053,000.00	4 h 52 min
Dec 21	11:00	Challenge 3	$700 NLHE [Progressive Super-Knockout]	(Czech Republic) Kubík Micro	$96,067.12	1,779	$600,412.50	13 h 4 min
Dec 21	15:00	Challenge 4	$1,050 NLHE [8-Max]	(Israel) Timorm1	$205,495.00	1,126	$1,126,000.00	13 h 38 min
Dec 22	11:00	Challenge 5	$215 NLHE	(Mexico) buckguy2200	$170,580.00	6,332	$1,266,400.00	12 h 7 min
Dec 22	13:00	Challenge 6	$1,050+R PLO	(Denmark) AlexKP (Alexander Petersen)	$257,000.00	9,001	$1,800,200.00	[2-Day] event
Dec 22	14:30	Challenge 7	$215 NLHE	(Netherlands) roscootje459	$302,282.00	11,644	$2,328,800.00	[2-Day] event
Dec 22	15:30	Challenge 8	$2,100 NLHE Main Event	(Singapore) DEHELLHOUND	$516,235.00	1,541	$3,082,000.00	[2-Day] event

=== Challenge Series 2 (2014) ===
Date	Time (ET)	Event #	Event	Winner	Prize	Entries	Prize pool	Elapsed time
Mar 28	13:00	Challenge 1	$109 NL Hold’em	(Estonia) mellsol	$118,000.70	8,756	$875,600.00	12 h 17 min
Mar 28	17:00	Challenge 2	$215+R NL Hold’em [Turbo]	(Norway) MarkusG91	$117,881.23	1,775	$1,050,800.00	4 h 32 min
Mar 29	11:00	Challenge 3	$700 NL Hold’em [Progressive Super-Knockout]	(Romania) luckyno75 (Luciana Manolea)	$105,733.03	1,958	$1,321,650.00	12 h 5 min
Mar 29	14:30	Challenge 4	$1.050 NL Hold’em [8-Max]	(Germany) DSmunichlife	$176,079.74	1,224	$1,224,000.00	14 h 30 min
Mar 29	17:00	Challenge 5	$215 NL Hold’em [6-Max, Turbo]	(Finland) Hawmis	$88,357.50	2,805	$561,000.00	3 h 20 min
Mar 30	11:00	Challenge 6	$215 NL Hold’em	(Austria) Elfcoder	$200,192.00	6,400	$1,280,000.00	11 h 29 min
Mar 30	13:00	Challenge 7	$700 PL Omaha [6-Max, 1R1A]	(Finland) römpsä	$149,598.61	588	$787,360.00	10 h 05 min
Mar 30	14:30	Challenge 8	$215 NL Hold’em	(Australia) willwin88	$230,000.00	12,132	$2,426,400.00	[2-Day] event
Mar 30	15:30	Challenge 9	$2.100 NL Hold’em Main Event	(United Kingdom) hitthehole (Tom Middleton)	$500,000.00	1,624	$3,248,000.00	[2-Day] event

=== Challenge Series 3 (2014) ===
Date	Time (ET)	Event #	Event	Winner	Prize	Entries	Prize pool	Elapsed time
Aug 1	13:00	Challenge 1	$109 NL Hold’em	(Brazil) ivoelemento (Ivo Gomes)	$108,584.31	8,025	$802,500.00	11 h 05 min
Aug 1	17:00	Challenge 2	$215+R NL Hold’em [Turbo]	(Mexico) BlackFourz	$150,716.50	1,576	$899,800.00	4 h 17 min
Aug 2	11:00	Challenge 3	$700 NL Hold’em [Progressive Super-Knockout]	(Canada) wormnorton (Sean Getzwiller)	$92,196.72	1,733	$1,152,445.00	12 h 16 min
Aug 2	14:30	Challenge 4	$1.050 NL Hold’em [8-Max]	(Peru) DestinoTrece	$187,792.50	1,029	$1,029,000.00	13 h 34 min
Aug 2	17:00	Challenge 5	$215 NL Hold’em [6-Max, Turbo]	(United Kingdom) PokerPolic3	$77,803.60	2,447	$489,400.00	3 h 23 min
Aug 3	11:00	Challenge 6	$215 NL Hold’em	(Austria) Keep3r	$160,553.17	5,117	$1,023,400.00	11 h 22 min
Aug 3	13:00	Challenge 7	$700 PL Omaha [6-Max, 1R1A]	(Brazil) Tu Ta Tenso? (Victor Talamini)	$123,696.86	503	$651,035.00	10 h 26 min
Aug 3	14:30	Challenge 8	$215 NL Hold’em	(Israel) mor255	$139,148.81	10,164	$2,032,800.00	[2-Day] event
Aug 3	15:30	Challenge 9	$2.100 NL Hold’em Main Event	(Canada) gray31 (Grayson Ramage)	$502,165.00	1,499	$2,998,000.00	[2-Day] event

== WCOOP Challenge winners by country ==
List of countries
1. Austria - 2
2. Brazil - 2
3. Canada - 2
4. Finland - 2
5. Israel - 2
6. Mexico - 2
7. United Kingdom - 2
8. Australia - 1
9. Czech Republic - 1
10. Denmark - 1
11. Estonia - 1
12. Germany - 1
13. Netherlands - 1
14. Norway - 1
15. Peru - 1
16. Poland - 1
17. Romania - 1
18. Singapore - 1
19. Sweden - 1

== See also ==
- World Cup of Poker
- Full Tilt Online Poker Series
