= List of Old Malvernians =

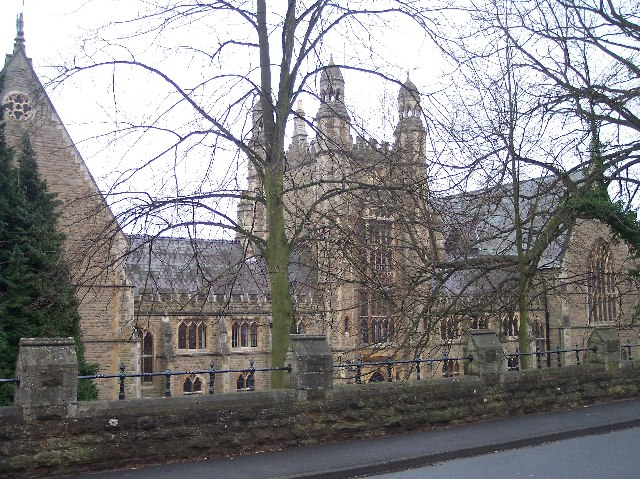
Malvern College

Old Malvernians are alumni of Malvern College, an independent day and boarding school in Malvern, Worcestershire, England that was founded in 1865. Originally a school for boys aged 9 to 18, it merged in 1992 with a private boys' primary school and an independent school for girls to become coeducational for pupils aged 3 to 18.

Many alumni have gained recognition in such fields as the military, politics, business, science, culture and sport - especially first-class cricket and the eighteen county cricket clubs. Among the most famous Old Malvernians are spymaster James Jesus Angleton, former head of the CIA's counter-intelligence; Aleister Crowley, the controversial but influential occultist; actor Denholm Elliott, sportsman R. E. Foster, the only man to have captained England at both cricket and football; and novelist C. S. Lewis, author of The Chronicles of Narnia. Other well-known personalities include businessman Baron MacLaurin, a former chairman of Tesco and Vodafone; Jeremy Paxman, journalist, author, and BBC presenter of Newsnight and University Challenge; and Baron Weatherill, the former Speaker of the House of Commons. Old Malvernians who have become heads of state or government include the eponymously titled Viscount Malvern and Najib Tun Razak, the 6th prime minister of Malaysia. The former was the British Commonwealth's longest-serving prime minister by the time he left office. Old Malvernian Nobel Prize winners include Francis William Aston, winner of the 1922 Nobel Prize for Chemistry, and James Meade, winner of the Nobel Prize for Economics in 1977.

== A ==
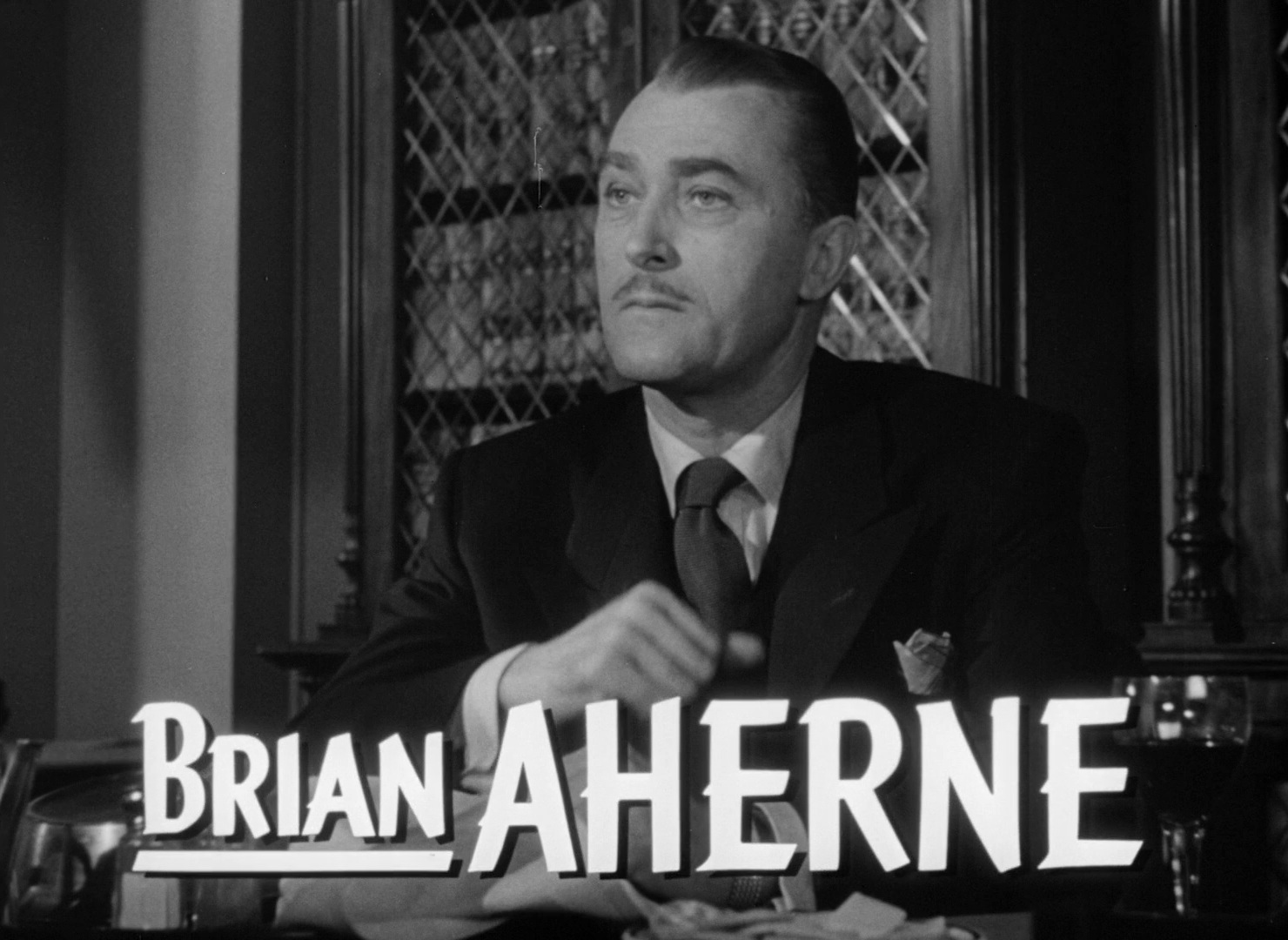
Brian Aherne

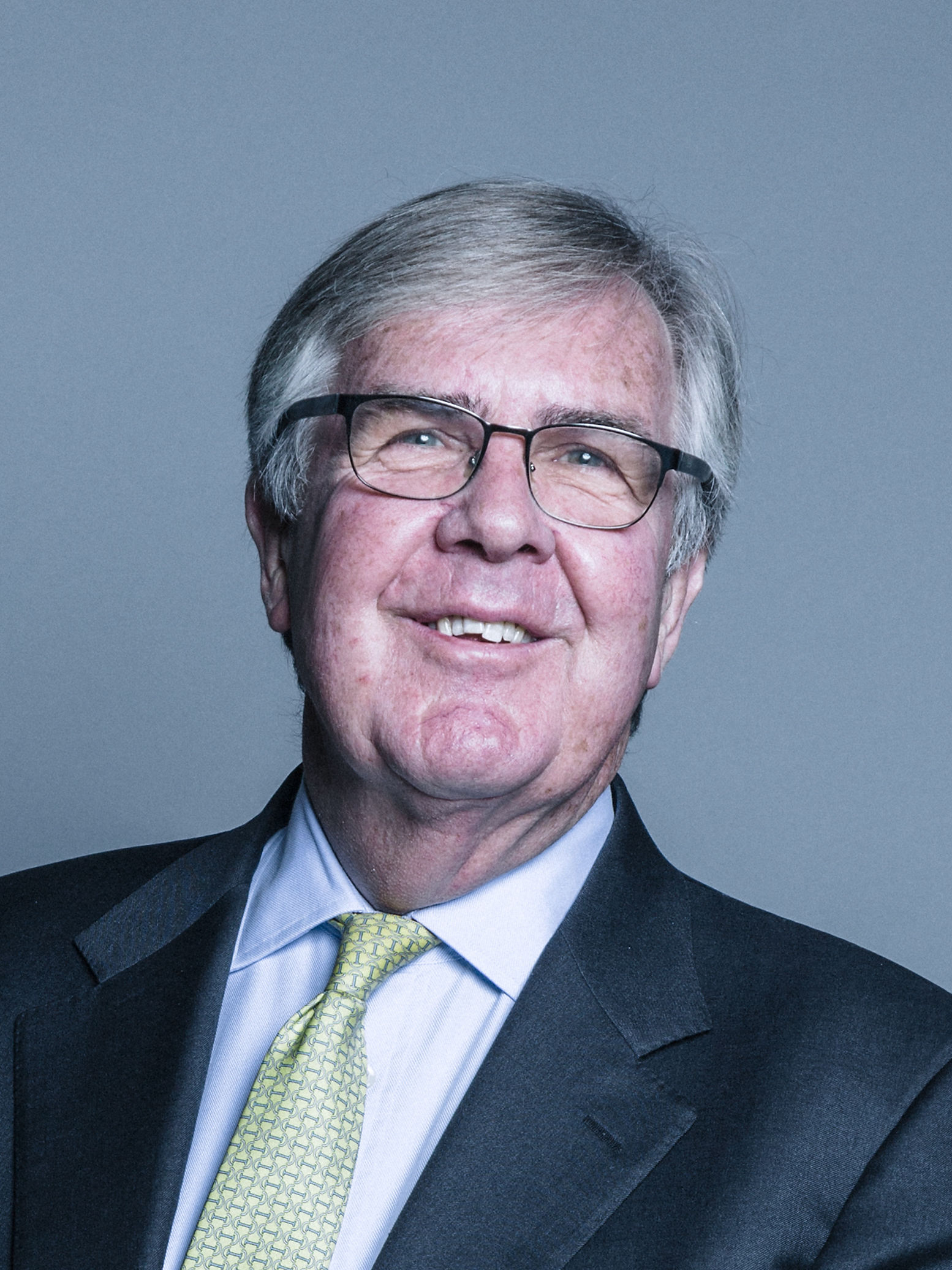
John Anderson

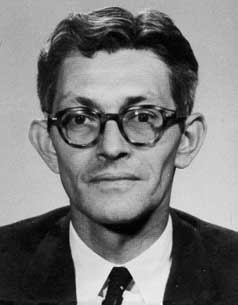
James Jesus Angleton

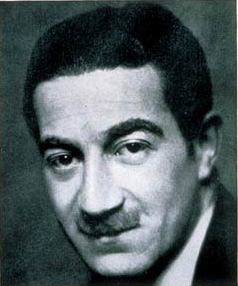
Michael Arlen (from TIME cover)

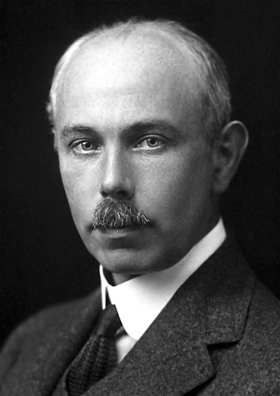
Francis William Aston

- Lascelles Abercrombie, (1881–1938), poet, journalist, critic
- Diran Adebayo FRSL, novelist, cultural critic and academic, tales of London and the lives of African diasporans
- Brian Aherne, stage, screen, radio and television actor. Hollywood Walk of Fame and Oscar nominee.
- Douglas Allday, First-class cricket cricketer for the Europeans cricket team and British Army officer
- Ollie Allsopp, professional rugby player for Hartpury University R.F.C. in the RFU Championship, London Scottish RFC, Birmingham Moseley Rugby in National League 1 and Harlequins F.C.
- John Anderson, 3rd Viscount Waverley
- Tim Anderson, Commonwealth Games gold medal winner and Olympian
- James Jesus Angleton, chief of counter-intelligence for the CIA from 1954 to 1974. Source of inspiration for the character Edward Wilson in the film The Good Shepherd.
- Nicholas Argenti, stockbroker, British Army officer, Royal Air Force officer, and philatelist
- Michael Arlen, prolific essayist, short story writer, novelist, playwright, and scriptwriter.
- Alban Arnold, cricketer for Cambridge University Cricket Club and Hampshire County Cricket Club
- Francis William Aston, chemist and physicist, won the Nobel Prize in Chemistry in 1922 for work on mass spectrometry.

== B ==
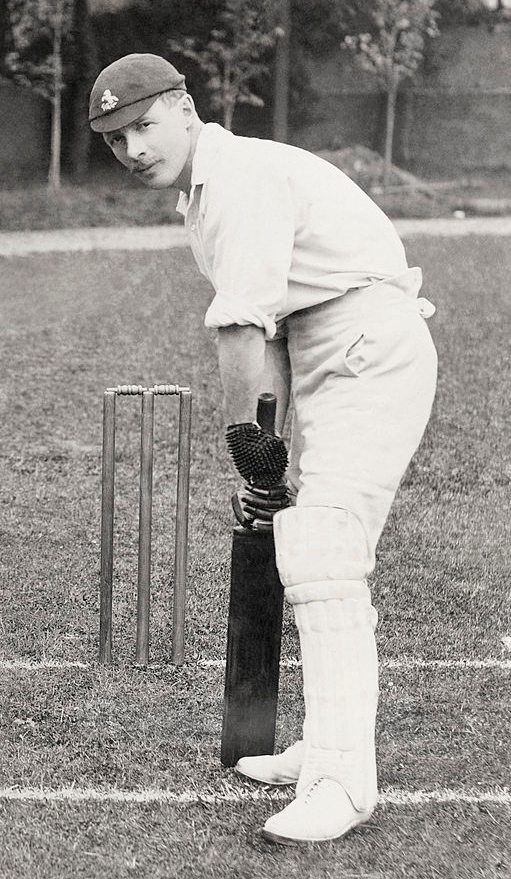
Cuthbert Burnup

- Ralph Bagnold, geo-morphologist, pioneering desert explorer, founder and commander of the Long Range Desert Group
- James Balfour-Melville (1882–1915), British Army officer, footballer for Oxford University A.F.C., and cricketer for Scotland
- Charles Bambridge (1858–1935), England international footballer and captain
- Sir Hugh Shakespear Barnes, British Indian administrator
- Admiral of the Fleet Sir Varyl Begg, First Sea Lord, Governor of Gibraltar
- Prince Joachim of Belgium, Archduke of Austria-Este
- Humphry Berkeley, politician, humourist, early supporter for Gay rights in the UK, and Conservative Member of Parliament.
- Wilfred Bird, played first-class cricket for Middlesex County Cricket Club and Oxford University Cricket Club
- Lieutenant-Colonel Sir Walter Bromley-Davenport, British Army officer, Conservative Member of Parliament, British Army welterweight boxing champion
- Harold Brougham, FA Cup winner in 1880 with Clapham Rovers
- Sir Stephen Brown, Lord Justice of Appeal, President of the Family Division of the High Court of Justice, Royal Navy officer
- Vice Admiral Sir Peter Buchanan, naval officer
- Cuthbert Burnup, England footballer, cricketer for Cambridge University, Marylebone Cricket Club, Kent, and London county cricket clubs
- Claude Burton, cricketer for Oxford University and Yorkshire County Cricket Club.
- Philip Bushill-Matthews, politician, former Member of the European Parliament

== C ==
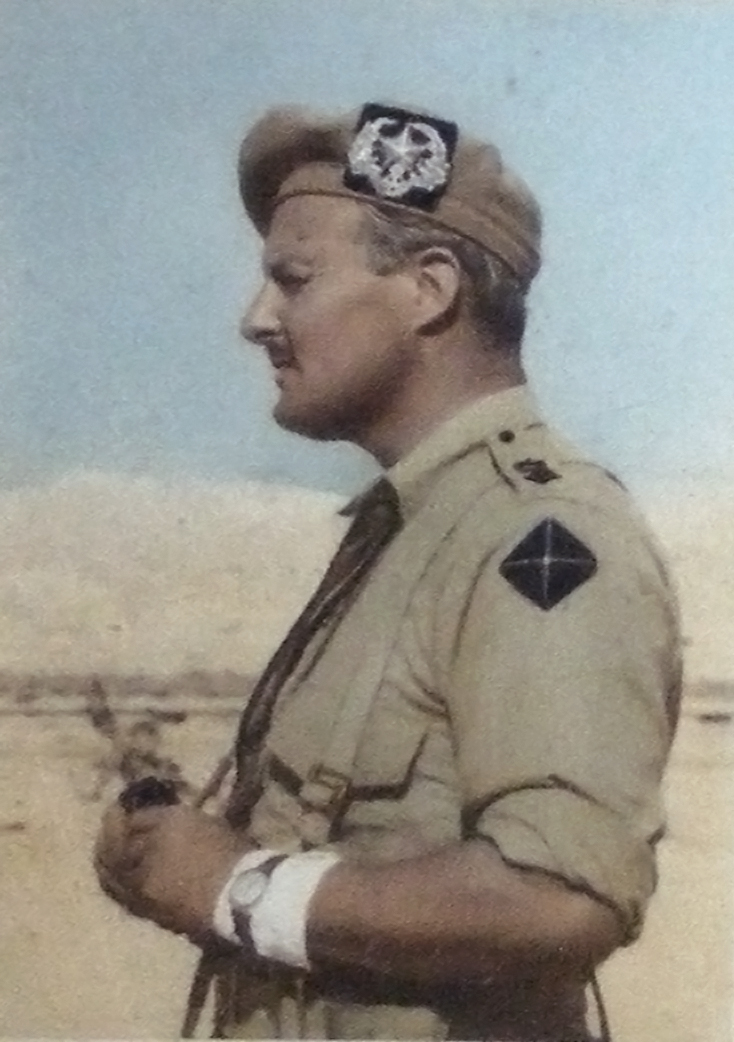
Duncan Carter-Campbell of Possil

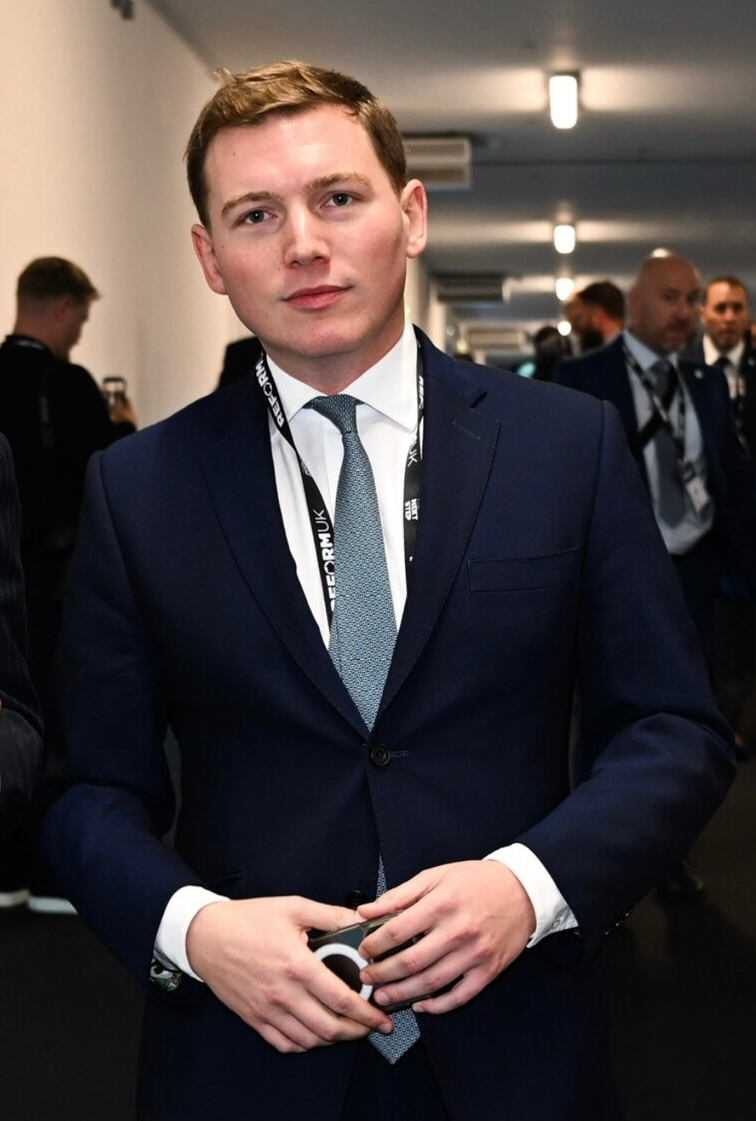
George Cottrell

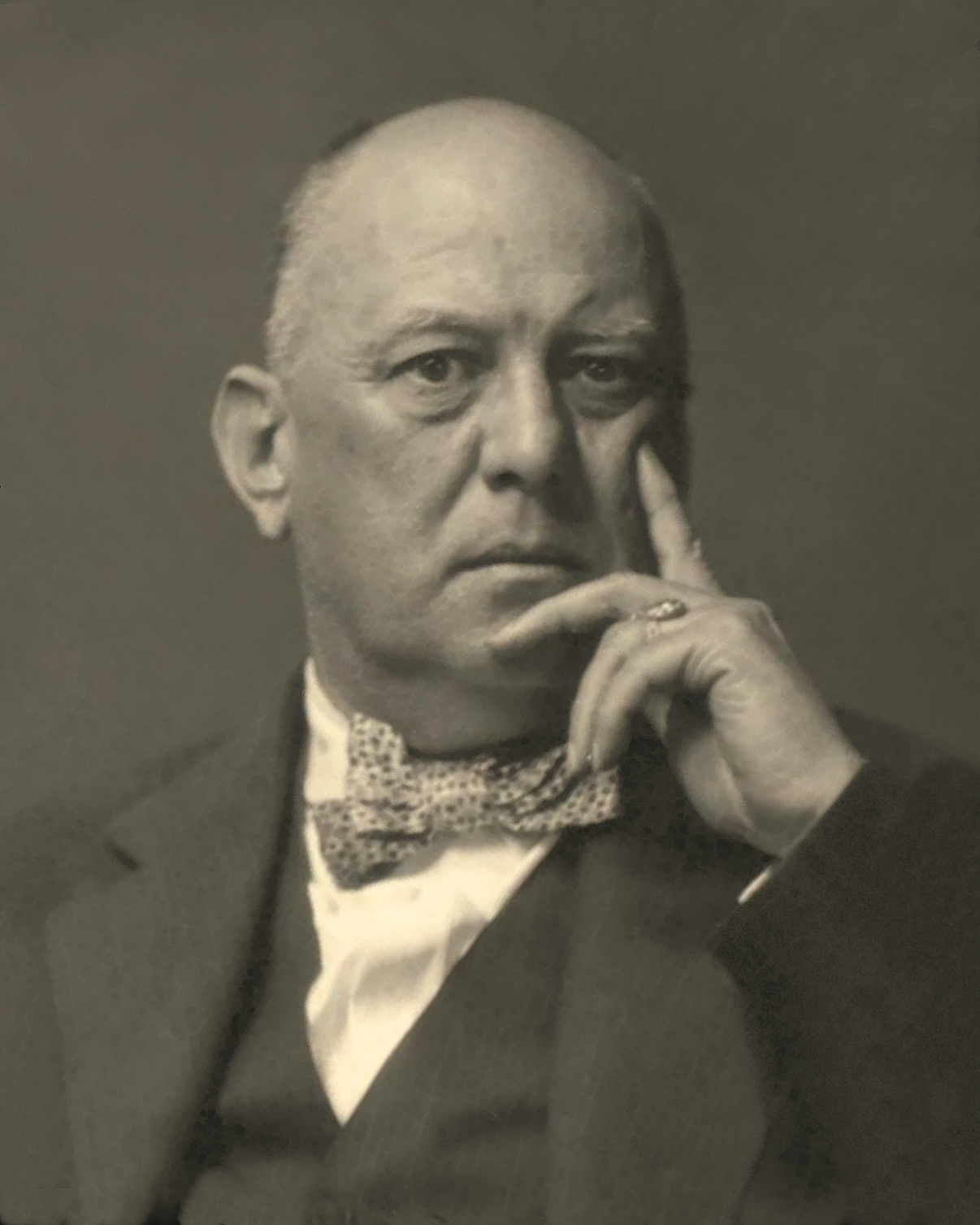
Aleister Crowley

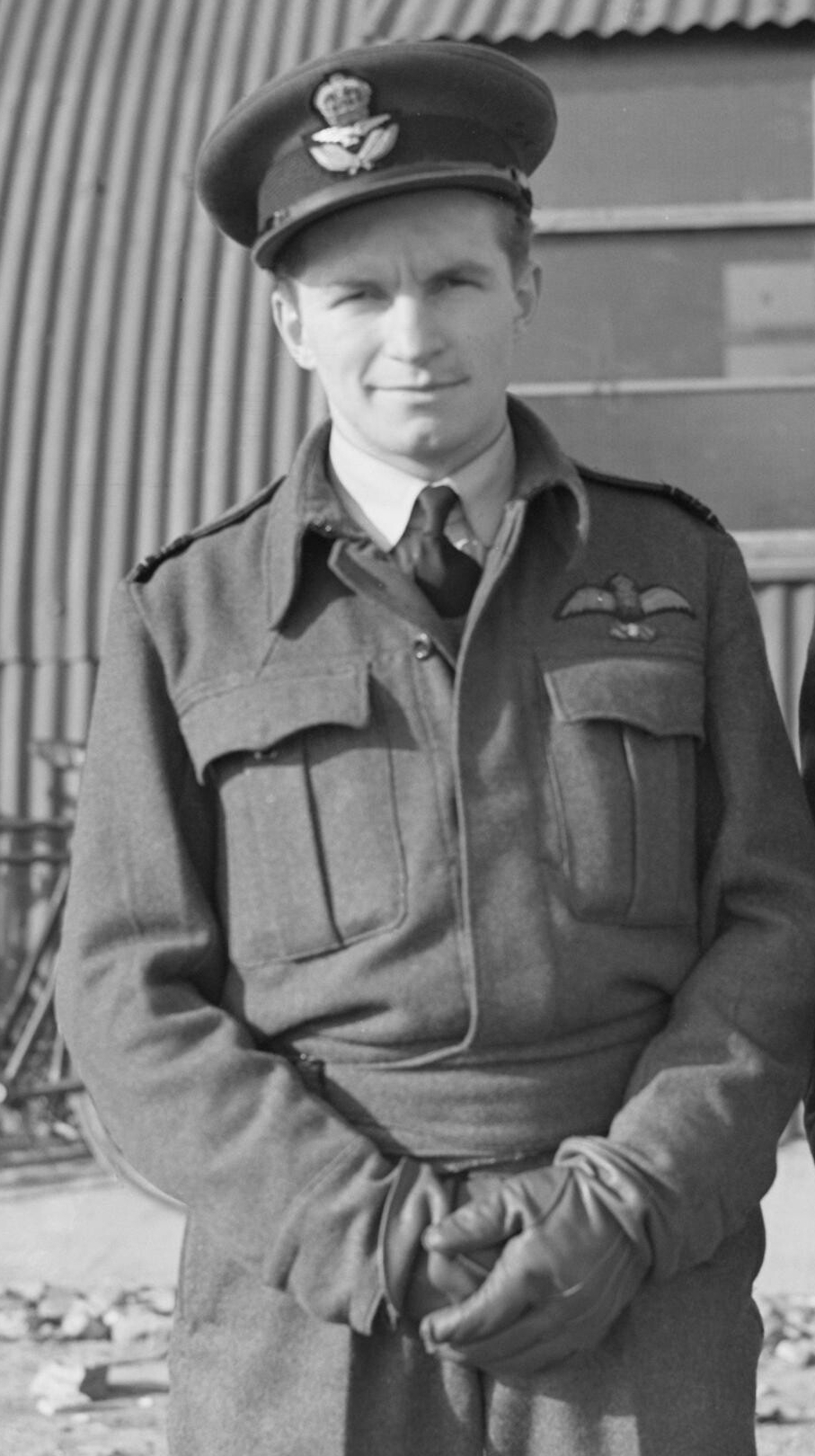
Denis Crowley-Milling

- Henry Montgomery Campbell, bishop
- Lieutenant Colonel Duncan Carter-Campbell of Possil, British Army officer
- George Chesterton, cricketer for Worcestershire County Cricket Club, cricket author, and former deputy head of Malvern College
- David Chipp, journalist, former chief editor of Reuters and the Press Association
- Prof Geoffrey Duncan Chisholm, surgeon and urologist
- Peter Churchill, intelligence officer in Special Operations Executive F Section (1940−1945)
- Horatio Clare, writer of travel, memoir, nature and children's books, and BBC Radio producer
- Sir Andrew Cohen, Governor of Uganda, UK representative to the U.N. Trusteeship Council and Permanent Secretary of the Department for International Development.
- Bernard Collins, cricketer
- Geoffrey Cornu, cricketer for the Free Foresters Cricket Club and British Army officer
- George Cottrell, former politician and deputy treasurer of the UK Independence Party (UKIP), financier, and convicted felon.
- Aleister Crowley, occultist, ceremonial magician, poet, painter, mountaineer, and prolific author of poetry and novels
- Air Marshal Sir Denis Crowley-Milling, flying ace in the Battle of Britain
- Edward Cuthbertson, cricketer, stockbroker, and British Army officer

== D ==
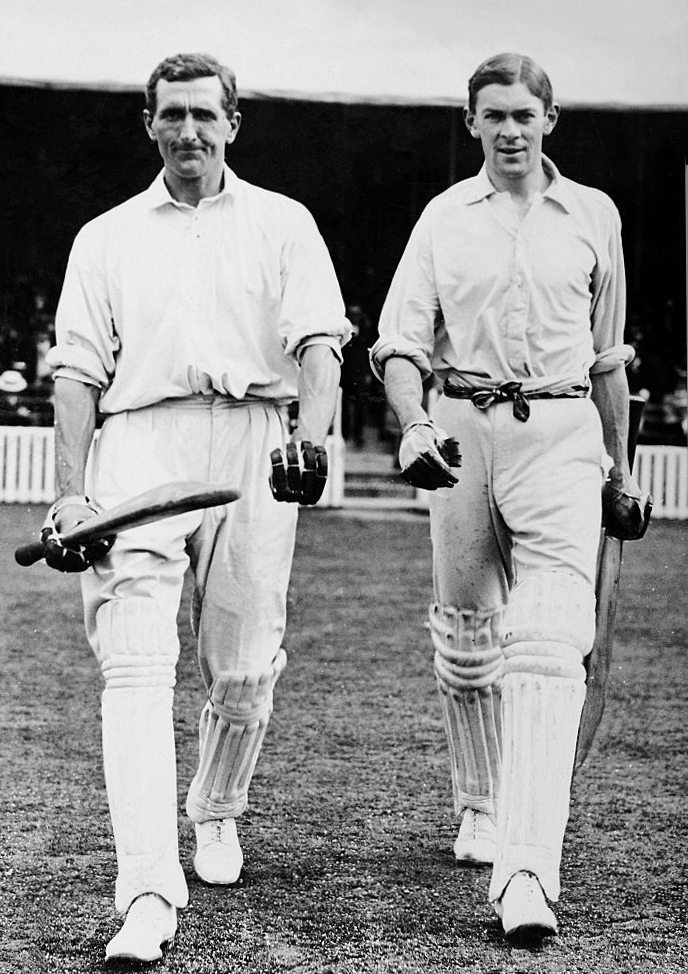
Arthur Day (right)

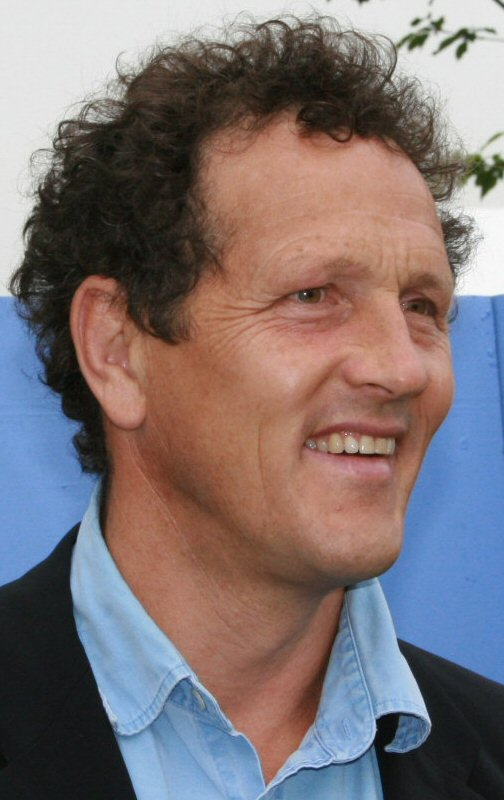
Monty Don

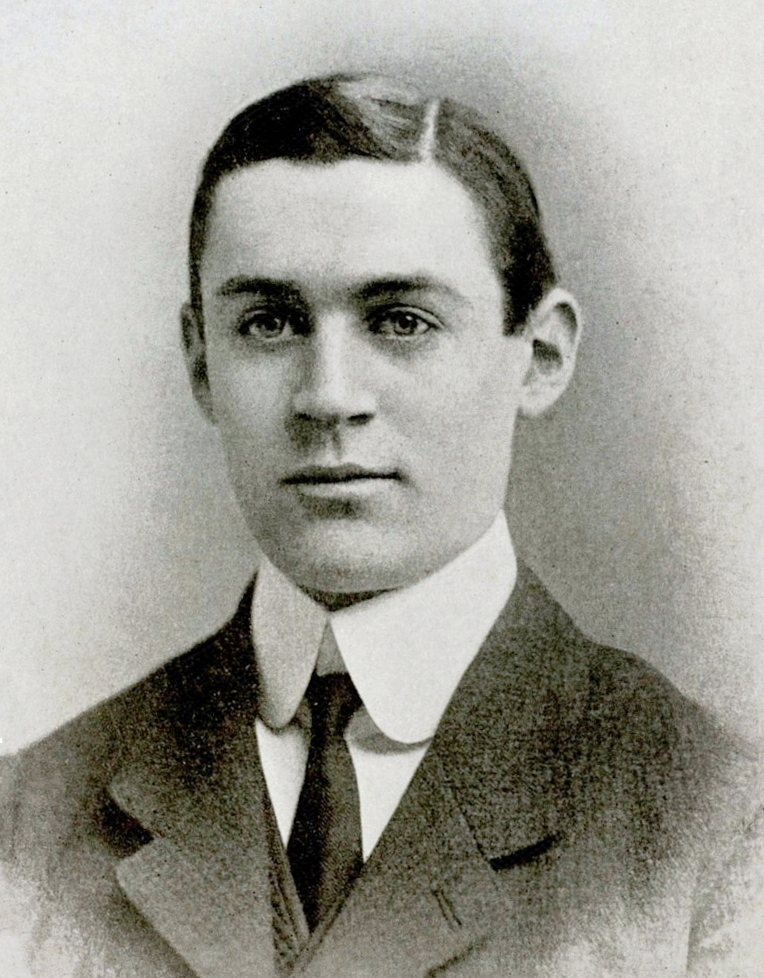
Samuel Day

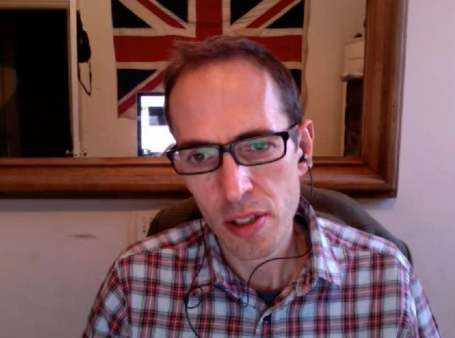
James Delingpole

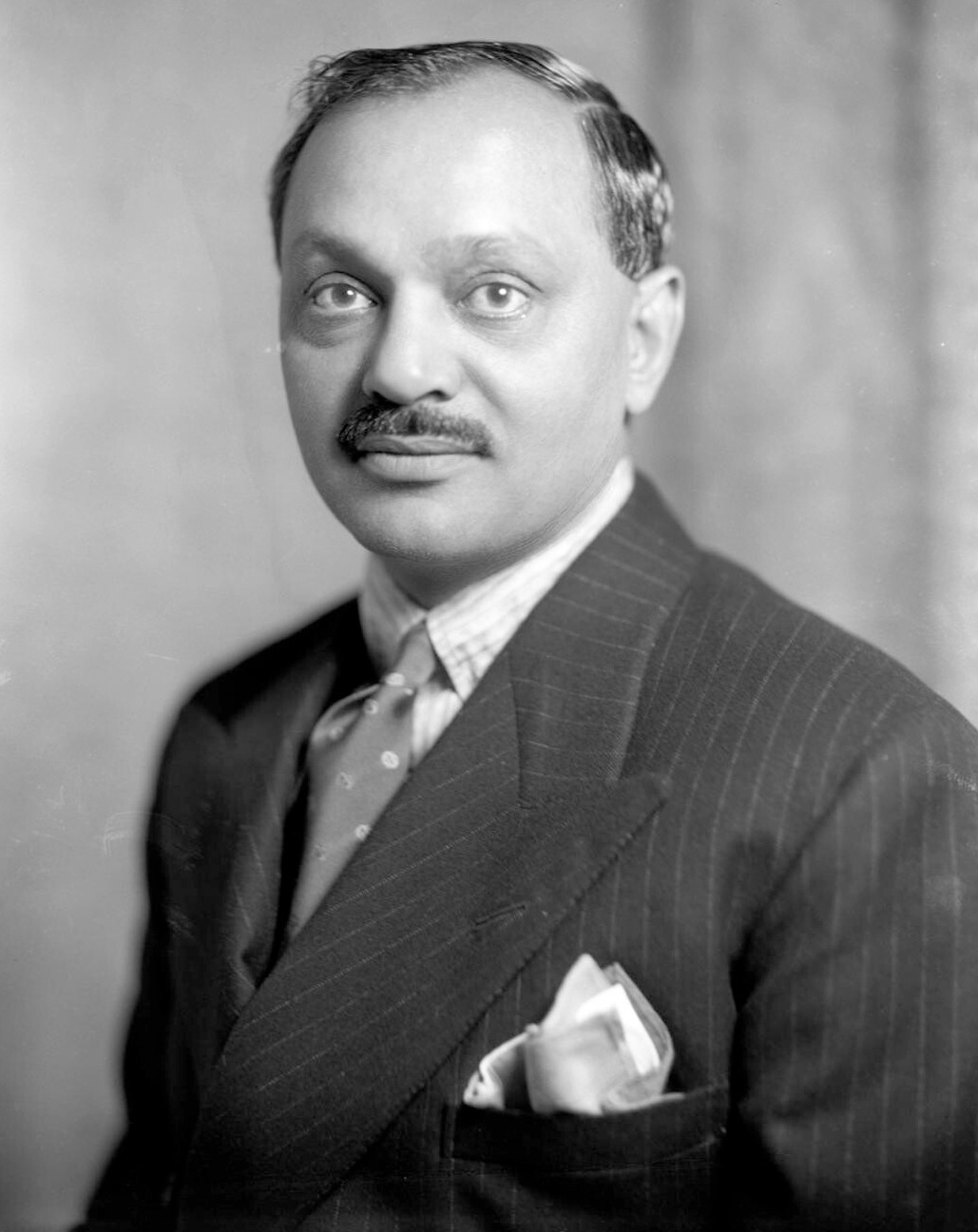
Digvijaysinhji Ranjitsinhji Jadeja

- Arthur Day, cricketer for Kent County Cricket Club, stockbroker, and British Army officer
- Samuel Day, cricketer for Kent County Cricket Club, footballer for Corinthian F.C., and England
- James Delingpole, journalist, columnist, novelist, Bastiat Prize winner.
- Sir Edward Brandis Denham, colonial governor
- Henry de Vere Stacpoole, British writer
- Sir John Dick-Lauder, 11th Baronet
- Digvijaysinhji Ranjitsinhji Jadeja, (1895–1966), Maharaja Jam Sahib of Nawanagar
- Guy Disney, (1982—), First amputee jockey to win a horse race at a professional race-course in Britain (February 2017).
- Monty Don, BBC television presenter, writer and speaker on horticulture
- Ignazio Dracopoli, Anglo-French cartographer and explorer
- Nigel Draffan, cricketer for Cambridge University Cricket Club
- Sandy Duncan, athlete, general secretary of the British Olympic Association (1949–1975)

== E ==
William Evans

- Sir Frederick Eden, 2nd Baronet of the Province of Maryland, English writer on poverty and pioneering social investigator
- Rehaan Edavalath, cricketer for Worcestershire
- Ricardo Ellcock, cricketer for Worcestershire and Middlesex county cricket clubs and the England team
- Sir John Ellerman, 2nd Baronet, shipping magnate, natural historian and philanthropist
- Denholm Elliott, actor with 125 film and television credits and 3 times BAFTA award winner.
- Lloyd Embley, journalist, editor-in-chief of the Trinity Mirror group
- William Evans, cricketer for Worcestershire and Hampshire county cricket clubs
- Ambrose Evans-Pritchard, international business editor of The Daily Telegraph and author of The Secret Life of Bill Clinton.

== F ==
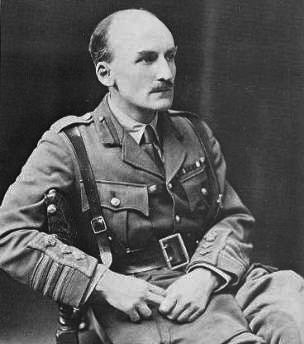
J.F.C. Fuller

- John Ferraby, Hand of the Cause in the Bahá’í Faith
- Air Vice-Marshal Sir Edward Fielden, pilot, Captain of The Queen's Flight
- Sir Eustace Fiennes, 1st Baronet of Banbury, politician, colonial governor
- Sir Gerald Fitzmaurice, barrister, judge
- Sir Charles Fletcher-Cooke, politician and Conservative MP, barrister (QC), and Member of the European Parliament
- Giles Foden, author of The Last King of Scotland
- "Fostershire", the Foster brothers who played for Worcestershire County Cricket Club:
- Basil Foster, Geoffrey Foster, Harry Foster, Maurice Foster, Neville Foster, Reginald "Tip" Foster, the only man to have captained England at both cricket and football, and Wilfrid "Bill" Foster
- Major General John F. C. Fuller, military historian, strategist, occultist

== G ==
- Sir Anthony Hastings George, British Consul-General in Shanghai and Boston
- Sir Peter Gibson, judge and Lord Justice of Appeal
- Carl Alexander Gibson-Hill (1911–1963), doctor, naturalist and Director of the Raffles Museum in Singapore
- John Godwin, naval officer, commando (Operation Checkmate)
- Penrhyn Grant Jones, Assistant Judge of the British Supreme Court for China
- Doctor Greenwood (1860–1951), Blackburn Rovers and England international footballer
- William Mitchell Grundy, English headmaster, son of Rev. W. Grundy, a former Headmaster of Malvern College.

== H ==
St. John Hankin

- Sir William Henry Hadow, English educationist, musicologist
- St. John Emile Clavering Hankin, Edwardian essayist and playwright
- Prince Christian of Hanover
- Prince Ernst August of Hanover
- Air Chief Marshal Sir Donald Hardman, flying ace, CAF (RAAF)
- Fred Hargreaves, footballer for Blackburn Rovers and the England team, cricketer for Lancashire County Cricket Club.
- Rose Harvey (born 1992), long-distance runner and in 2023 became the fifth fastest British female marathon runner of all time
- Jack Haynes (born 2001), cricketer for Worcestershire County Cricket Club and England squad for the 2020 Under-19 Cricket World Cup
- Josh Haynes (born 1999), cricketer for Leeds/Bradford MCC University
- General Sir Charles Harington, Deputy Chief of the General Staff
- George Harrison (1860–1900), cricketer for Oxford University Cricket Club
- Oliver Harvey, 1st Baron Harvey of Tasburgh (1893–1968), diplomat
- Peter Hatch, British Army officer, first-class cricketer for the Combined Services cricket team
- Colonel Sir Peter Hilton WWII veteran awarded the Military Cross and two bars
- Major General Richard Hilton DSO MC DFC, soldier, pilot, and author
- Megan Hine, British survival consultant, adventurer, television presenter and writer
- Sir Alan Lloyd Hodgkin (1914–1998) was a British physiologist and biophysicist, co-winner of the 1963 Nobel Prize for Physiology or Medicine, former president of the Royal Society, and Master of Trinity College, Cambridge
- Errol Holmes, cricketer for Oxford University, Surrey County Cricket Club and England
- Sir Peter Holmes (1932–2002), businessman, managing director (1985–1993) and chief executive officer (1992–1993) of Royal Dutch Shell
- Owen Hughes, cricketer and officer in both the British Army and the Royal Flying Corps
- Robin Hull (1905–1960), music critic
- Travers Christmas Humphreys, barrister, judge, founder of the London Buddhist Society and prolific author of books on the Buddhist tradition

== J ==
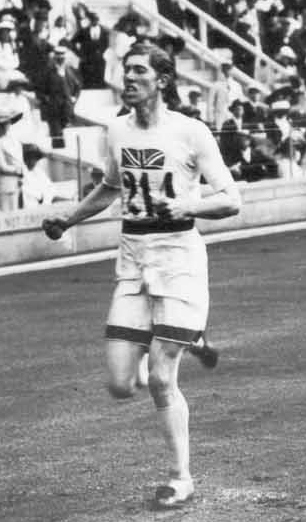
Arnold Jackson DSO

- Arnold Jackson, athlete (1500m gold medallist, 1912 Summer Olympics); youngest ever British Army Brigadier-General, awarded DSO & Three Bars; barrister.
- Ivan Johnson, cricketer for Worcestershire County Cricket Club and journalist
- Donald Johnston, British Army officer and cricketer for Oxford University Cricket Club

== K ==
- Shapur Kharegat journalist, editor and Asia Director of The Economist
- Donald Knight, first-class cricket for Surrey County Cricket Club, Oxford University Cricket Club and England
- William Knyvett, 1908 Olympian
- Tom Kohler-Cadmore (cricketer) for Worcestershire and Yorkshire county cricket clubs.

== L ==
- Starling Lawrence, Editor
- Sir Paul Ogden Lawrence, barrister, Court of Appeal judge, and Privy Council member
- Geoffrey Legge, pilot in the Fleet Air Arm during World War II, cricketer for Kent County Cricket Club and England team.
- Brian Lewis, 2nd Baron Essendon shipping, motor racing
- C. S. Lewis, novelist, scholar, Author of The Chronicles of Narnia.
- Warren Lewis (brother of C.S.Lewis), historian
- Lancelot Lowther, 6th Earl of Lonsdale
- Princess Marie-Caroline of Liechtenstein (Marie Caroline Elisabeth Immaculata); (b.1996), sixth in the Jacobite line of succession to the thrones of England, Scotland, and Ireland. She attended Ebenholz Primary School in Vaduz and the Swiss International School in the Rheintal.Boarded at Malvern College in England. She graduated from Parsons School of Design in 2020 with a degree in fashion design.
- Prince Joseph Wenzel of Liechtenstein, second in the line of succession to the Liechtensteiner throne and third in the Jacobite line of succession to the thrones of England, Scotland, and Ireland.

== M ==
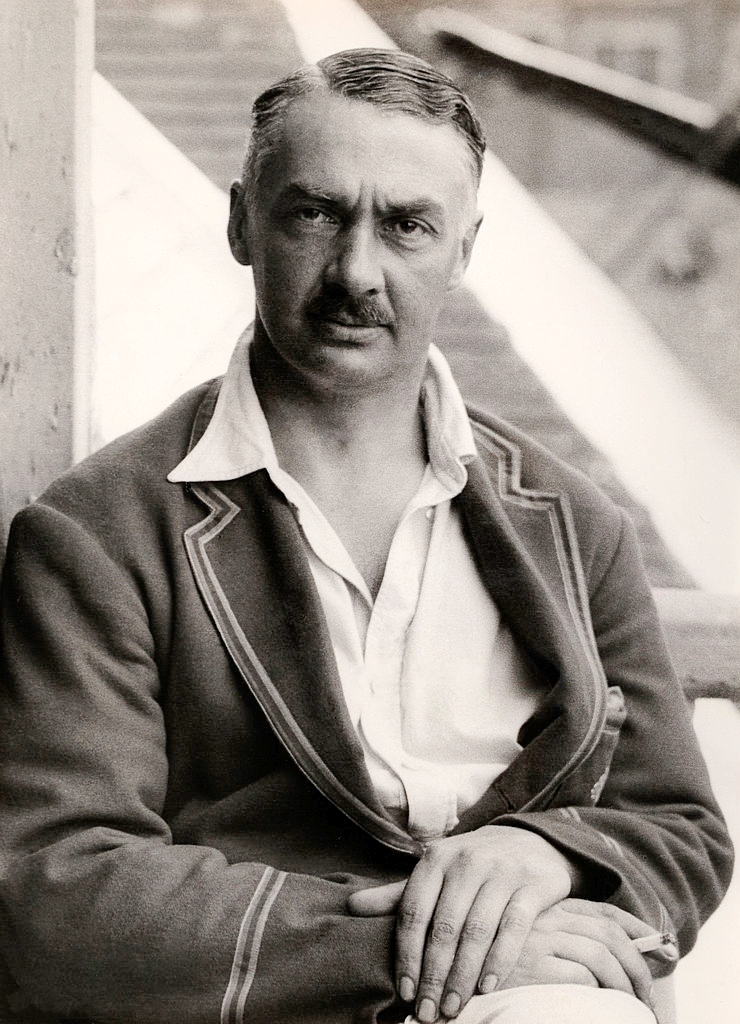
Frank Mann

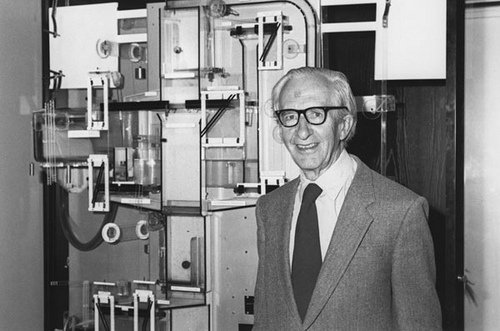
James Meade

- Ian MacLaurin, Baron MacLaurin of Knebworth, businessman, sports administrator
- Neil MacLaurin, son of Ian MacLaurin, and cricketer for Hertfordshire County Cricket Club and Middlesex County Cricket Club
- Bill Maidlow, cricketer for Oxford University Cricket Club
- Godfrey Martin Huggins, 1st Viscount Malvern, Prime Minister of Southern Rhodesia and of Rhodesia and Nyasaland, once described as the longest serving prime minister in British Commonwealth history.
- Zen Malik, cricketer for Warwickshire County Cricket Club
- Frank Mann, cricketer for Cambridge University Cricket Club, Middlesex County Cricket Club, and England cricket captain
- Ronald Mansbridge, publisher, author
- Eric Marx, South African cricketer, holder of a batting world record that stood for 73 years
- James Meade (1907–1995), economist, 1977 winner of the Nobel Prize in Economics.
- Brian Mears, chairman of Chelsea Football Club
- Joe Mears, chairman of The Football Association
- General Sir John Mogg, Deputy Supreme Allied Commander Europe (DSACEUR)
- Air chief marshal Hrushikesh Moolgavkar, 9th Chief of Staff of the Indian Air Force
- Raymond Mortimer, writer, critic, literacy editor
- Edward Moss, cricketer for Oxford University Cricket Club, Berkshire County Cricket Club, and Royal Air Force Volunteer Reserve officer
- Eric Moxey, recipient of the George Cross
- Kenneth Muir, recipient of the Victoria Cross
- Jonathan Myles-Lea, artist (landscape painter)

== N ==
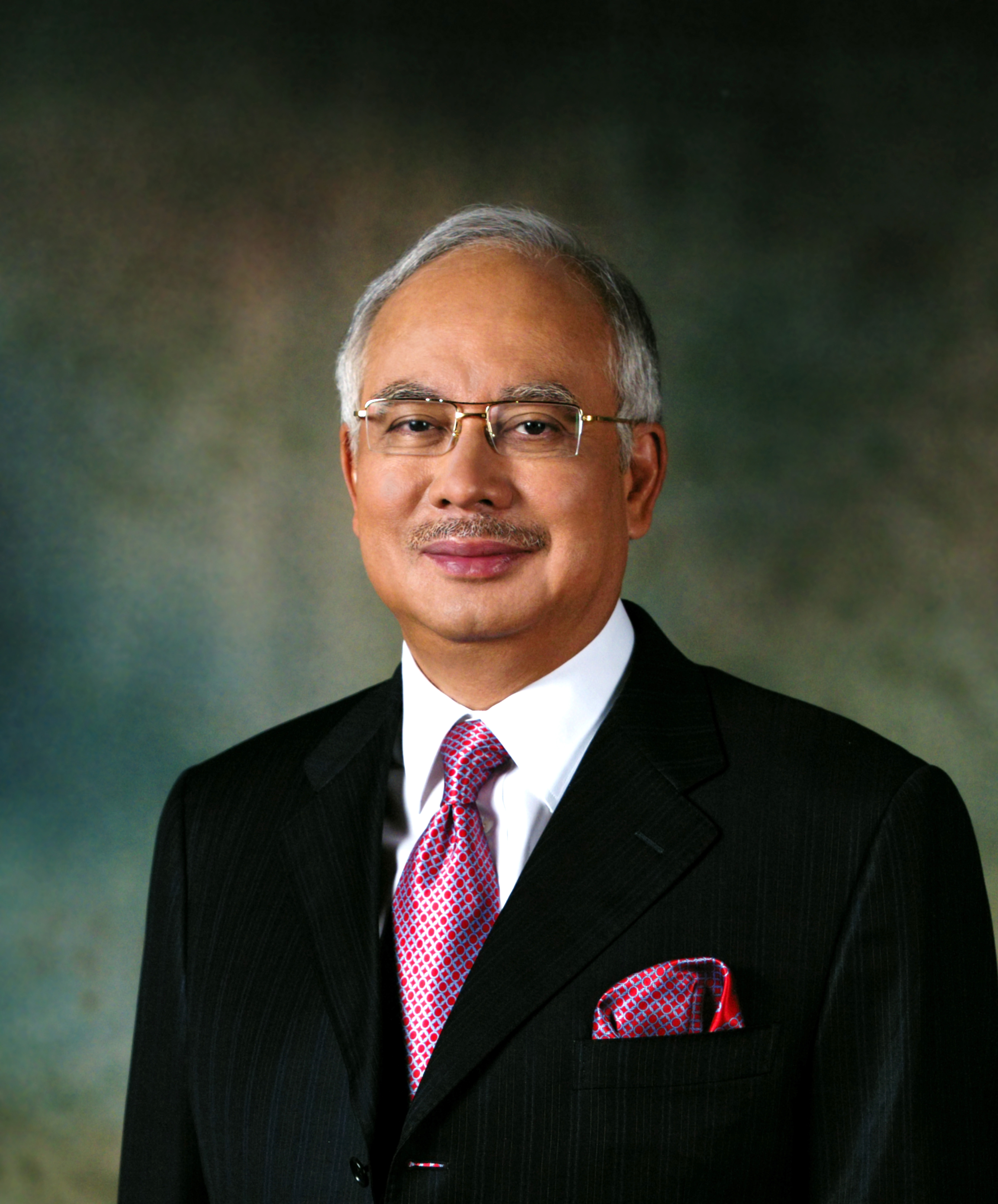
Najib Tun Razak

- Najib Razak, 6th Prime Minister of Malaysia
- David Nash, cricketer for Middlesex County Cricket Club
- Ivor Norton, cricketer for Marylebone Cricket Club, and British Army officer
- Sir Thomas Willans Nussey, 1st Baronet, barrister, Liberal Party politician, Member of Parliament

== O ==
- John Geoffrey Rowe Orchard, chartered accountant, politician, Mayor and Sheriff of Exeter
- Jane Owen, British politician and diplomat

== P ==
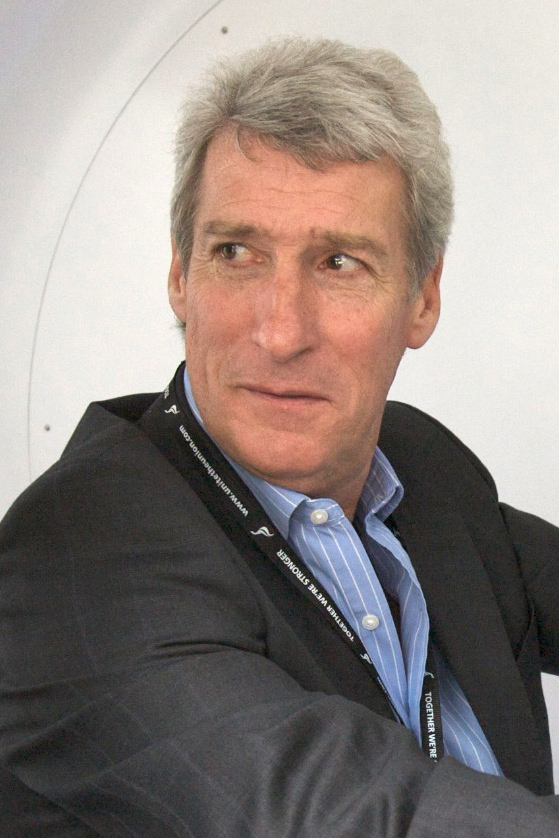
Jeremy Paxman

- Hubert Parker, Australian politician, Attorney-General of Western Australia
- Norman Partridge, cricketer for Cambridge University and Warwickshire
- James Paul, Argentine cricketer
- Giles Paxman (1951−2025), diplomat, HM Ambassador to Spain.
- Jeremy Paxman, journalist, author, broadcaster, presenter of University Challenge, brother of Giles Paxman
- Walter Pearce (1893–1960), first-class cricketer
- Thelwell Pike (1866–1957), footballer for Cambridge University, Crusaders, Brentwood Town, Swifts, Thanet Wanderers and Corinthian, and England
- James Plowden-Wardlaw, barrister and Church of England priest.
- Mark Pougatch, radio and television broadcaster, journalist, author, and presenter for ITV Sport,
- Sir Ghillean Prance, botanist, Director of the Royal Botanic Gardens, Kew from 1988 to 1999

== R ==
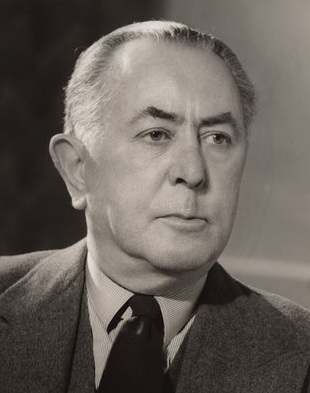
Howard Robertson

- Ahmed Rashid, Pakistani journalist, author
- John Rawlinson (1867–1945), cricketer for Oxford University Cricket Club, and stockbroker
- Christopher Reginald Reeves, banker (Morgan, Grenfell & Co. and Merrill Lynch)
- Charles Ridsdale, Anglican Bishop
- Sir Howard Robertson, president of the Royal Institute of British Architects from 1952 to 1954 and winner of the Royal Gold Medal for architecture.
- Alan S. C. Ross, linguist and ultimate source and inspiration for Nancy Mitford's 'U and non-U' forms of behaviour and language usage.
- Francis Routh, composer of some 85 published works, including three symphonies, chamber music, large scale solo piano and organ works and several song cycles
- Irwin Peter Russell, poet, translator, critic, World War II British Army officer

== S ==
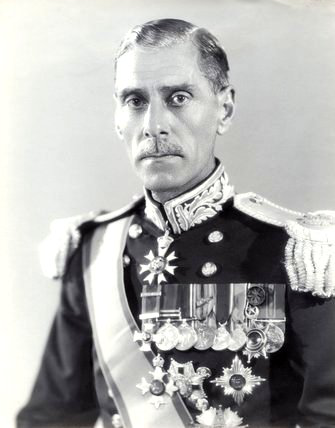
Sir George Symes

- Dominic Sandbrook, historian, author and journalist
- Guy Sanderson, Bishop of Plymouth
- Dennis W. Sciama, astrophysicist, PhD supervisor to cosmologists, including Stephen Hawking, Martin Rees and David Deutsch; he is considered one of the fathers of modern cosmology, author of The Unity of the Universe (1959)
- James Scott (rugby union), professional rugby player, formerly in Premiership Rugby with Worcester Warriors, RFU Championship with Jersey Reds, United Rugby Championship with Glasgow Warriors and is now a player of Chicago Hounds (rugby union) in Major League Rugby
- Major General Logan Scott-Bowden, first commander of the Ulster Defence Regiment, Colonel-Commandant of the Royal Engineers from 1975 to 1980
- Oliver Selfridge, computer scientist and a pioneer of artificial intelligence.
- Hugh Sells (1922–1978), cricketer for Royal Air Force cricket team, and Royal Air Force officer
- Sir Tom Shebbeare, Director of Charities to Charles, Prince of Wales
- Roger Short, diplomat, expert on Turkish affairs, and served as consul-general in Oslo and was the British ambassador to Bulgaria
- George Simpson-Hayward, cricketer for Worcestershire County Cricket Club (captain) where he was captain, and for the England cricket team
- David Smeeton, journalist
- Sydney Goodsir Smith, poet, artist, dramatist and novelist
- Thomas Stanford, Oscar winning film and television editor
- Christopher Storrs, priest, Bishop of the Anglican Diocese of Grafton, New South Wales
- Alfred Stratford, cricketer for Marylebone Cricket Club and Middlesex County Cricket Club. Footballer for England and three times FA Cup winner with Wanderers F.C.
- I. M. B. Stuart (1902–1969), Ireland rugby footballer, schoolmaster, and author
- Lieutenant Colonel Sir Stewart Symes, colonial governor

== T ==
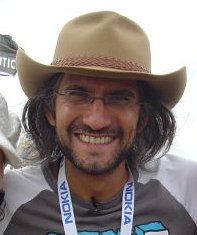
Eddie Temple-Morris

- Eddy Temple-Morris, DJ, record producer, TV presenter
- Baron Temple-Morris, barrister, politician, Conservative Member of Parliament, member of the House of Lords as a Labour peer
- Sir Richard Thompson, 1st Baronet, politician, Conservative Member of Parliament
- Meredith Thring, inventor and writer on energy conservation
- Roger Tolchard, cricketer for Leicestershire County Cricket Club and England
- Thomas Trotter, concert organist. Organist of Birmingham City, St Margaret's, Westminster, and president of St Albans International Organ Festival.
- Frank Tuff, cricketer for Oxford University and the Free Foresters
- Orville Turnquest, politician (The Bahamas)
- Ben Twohig, cricketer for Worcestershire County Cricket Club

== V ==
- James Vivian, Director of Music of St George's Chapel, Windsor Castle.

== W ==
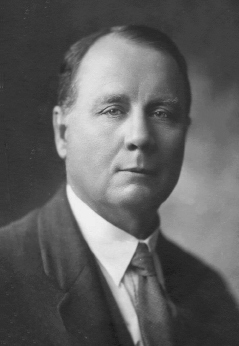
Charles Wittenoom

- Neville Wadia, Chairman of Bombay Dyeing
- Fulke Walwyn (1910–1991), racehorse jockey and trainer
- Baron Bernard Weatherill, politician, Speaker of the House of Commons
- Sir John Wheeler-Bennett, historian
- John Baker White, political writer, secret agent, politician, Member of Parliament for Canterbury
- Tim Whitmarsh, Classicist at Cambridge University, Fellow in Greek at Corpus Christi College, Oxford, and Professor of Ancient Literatures at the University of Oxford, Fellow of the British Academy
- Chris Whitty, epidemiologist and Chief Medical Officer for England during the COVID-19 pandemic
- Maurice Wilks (1904–1963), motor and aeronautical engineer, businessman. Conceived and developed the Land Rover.
- Cecil Williamson, screenwriter, editor and film director and influential Neopagan and Warlock
- Robert Wilson, politician, Deputy Speaker of the House of Commons of Northern Ireland
- Charles Wittenoom, Australian politician, Member of the Western Australian Legislative Council
- Lieutenant-Colonel John Woodhouse, pioneer of the Special Air Service selection systems, and creator of the soft drink Panda Pops

== X, Y, Z ==
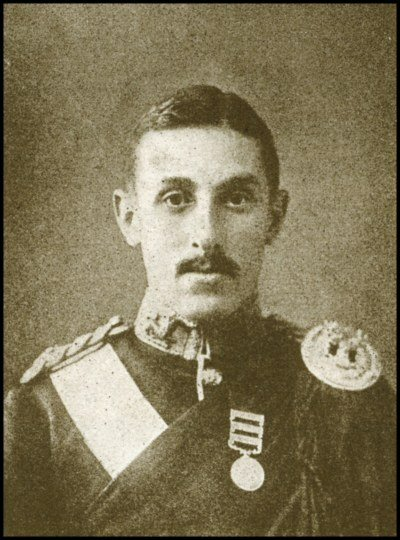
David Younger VC

- Captain David Younger, British Army officer (Gordon Highlanders) posthumous recipient of the Victoria Cross during the Boer War
