= Andy Murtagh =

Irish cricketer, cricket historian and cricket biographer

Personal information
- Full name: Andrew Joseph Murtagh
- Born: 6 May 1949 (age 77); Dublin, Leinster, Ireland
- Batting: Right-handed
- Bowling: Right-arm medium
- Relatives: Chris Murtagh (nephew); Tim Murtagh (nephew)

Domestic team information
- Years: Team
- 1973–1977: Hampshire
- 1973/74: Eastern Province

Career statistics
Competition	First-class	List A
Matches	27	48
Runs scored	640	481
Batting average	15.23	16.58
100s/50s	–/1	–/1
Top score	65	65*
Balls bowled	714	570
Wickets	6	23
Bowling average	81.50	19.73
5 wickets in innings	–	1
10 wickets in match	–	–
Best bowling	2/46	5/33
Catches/stumpings	9/–	17/–
- Source: Cricinfo, 23 December 2009

Andrew Joseph Murtagh (born 6 May 1949) is an Irish former first-class cricketer. He played county cricket for Hampshire between 1973 and 1977, before becoming a schoolteacher. After retiring from teaching, he became a cricket historian and biographer.

== Life and cricket career ==
Murtagh was born at Dublin in May 1949. Having played club cricket in the London area, it was while reading English at the University of Southampton that he was spotted by Hampshire and was invited to play for their second eleven in 1968. Five years later, he made his first eleven debut in a first-class match against Gloucestershire at Bristol in the 1973 County Championship, with Murtagh making six appearances in Hampshire's Championship-winning season. In the same season, he also made his debut in List A one-day cricket in the John Player League against Sussex at Portsmouth. During the winter which followed the 1973 season, Murtagh played a single first-class match in South Africa for Eastern Province in South Africa against Natal in the 1973–74 Currie Cup. He did not play for Hampshire in the 1974 season, but returned to the side in 1975, with seven first-class and eleven one-day appearances. It was in 1975 that he made his highest first-class score, with 65 against Gloucestershire. In 1976, he made his highest one-day score, an unbeaten 65 against Derbyshire. Murtagh played first-class and one-day cricket for Hampshire until 1977, making 26 and 48 appearances respectively. In first-class cricket, he was utilised as a lower middle order batsman, scoring 631 runs at an average of 15.39. He was more effective in one-day cricket, scoring 481 runs at an average of 16.58; as a medium pace bowler in one-day cricket, he took 23 wickets at a bowling average of 19.73. He took one five wicket haul, with figures of 5 for 33 against Yorkshire at Huddersfield in 1977. Murtagh was released by Hampshire alongside Richard Elms at the end of the 1978 season, having not featured for the county that season.

Following his release by Hampshire, he became an English teacher and cricket master at Malvern College, where he stayed until his retirement in 2000. Following his retirement, Murtagh has written a number of biographies on cricketers, including his former Hampshire teammates John Holder and Barry Richards. His nephews Tim and Chris Murtagh both played cricket professionally, with Tim playing at international level for Ireland.

=== Selected works ===
- A Remarkable Man: The Story of George Chesterton. London: Shire Publications. 2012. ISBN 9781782000198.
- Touched by Greatness: The Story of Tom Graveney, England's Much Loved Cricketer. Brighton: Pitch Publishing Limited. 2014. ISBN 9781785314001.
- Sundial in the Shade: The Story of Barry Richards, the Genius Lost to Test Cricket. Brighton: Pitch Publishing Limited. 2015. ISBN 9781785310102.
- Test of Character: The Story of John Holder, Fast Bowler and Test Match Umpire. Brighton: Pitch Publishing Limited. 2016. ISBN 9781785312427.
- Gentleman and Player: The Story of Colin Cowdrey, Cricket's Most Elegant and Charming Batsman. Brighton: Pitch Publishing Limited. 2017. ISBN 9781785313455.
- If Not Me, Who? The Story of Tony Greig, the Reluctant Rebel. Brighton: Pitch Publishing Limited. 2020. ISBN 9781785316418.
- Cricket's Black Dog: The Story of Depression Among Cricketers. Brighton: Pitch Publishing. 2025. ISBN 9781836801207.
