= List of teachers of Malvern College =

List of teachers ("masters") of Malvern College is a list of some of the notable masters and headmasters (past and present) of Malvern College, a UK independent day and boarding school in Malvern, Worcestershire, England. They have gained recognition or excelled in such fields as education, science, culture and sport.

== Headmasters ==
- 1865: Rev. Arthur Faber
- 1880–1885: Rev. Charles Thomas Cruttwell
- 1894–1897: Rev. William Grundy
- 1897–1914: Rev. Sydney Rhodes James
- 1914–1937: Frank Sansome Preston
- 1937–1953: Rev. Canon Howard Charles Adie Gaunt (known as Tom Gaunt)
- 1953–1971: Donald Dunrod Lindsay (27.09.1910–14 November 2003), chairman of the HMC
- 1971–1982: Martin John Wyndham Rogers, Chairman of HMC
- 1983–1996: Roy de C. Chapman, chairman of the HMC (1994), schools inspector
- 1997–2006: Hugh C. K. Carson
- 2006–2007: David Dowdles
- 2008–2019: Antony Roy Clark
- 2019–present: Keith Metcalfe

== Other masters and mistresses ==
- Matthew Bayfield, master, headmaster of Eastbourne College, co-composer of Carmen Malvernense
- Ralph Blumenau, history teacher, philosophy historian and author
- Christina Boxer, director of girls' sport, former Olympic champion
- Rory Boyle, music educationalist, composer.
- Charles Brett, music teacher, countertenor
- Gerry Chalk, cricketer who taught at the school 1934–1938. Later captained Kent County Cricket Club and was shot down and died over northern France in 1943
- George Chesterton, deputy headmaster, cricketer, author
- Alan Duff, master, cricketer
- Charles Fiddian-Green, master, head of cricket, cricketer
- Julius Harrison, director of music; classical composer and conductor
- John Hart, classics master, the first ever male Mastermind winner in 1975, defendant in Pepper v Hart, Librarian and Curator of the Worcestershire Masonic Library and Museum Trust
- Graeme Hick, cricket coach, former England and Worcestershire cricketer
- Robert Holtby, chaplain (1952–54), clergyman, Dean of Chichester
- Ron Hughes, rackets professional and master
- John Lewis, physics master, pioneer of educational programmes, recipient of the Centenary Award for science teaching.
- David Loveday, chaplain, Bishop of Dorchester
- Major Ralph Lyon, director of music, co-composer of Carmen Malvernense
- Malcolm Nokes, chemistry teacher, former Olympic bronze medallist
- Wilfrid Noyce, master of modern languages (1946–50), mountaineer, the first man to reach the South Col of Everest in Sir John Hunt's celebrated expedition in 1953
- George Sayer, English master and biographer of the author C. S. Lewis
- Jeffrey Skitch, biology teacher, actor and operatic baritone best known for his performances and recordings with the D'Oyly Carte Opera Company.
- Robert Tims, chemistry master, housemaster, head of St Leonards School, principal examiner for IB chemistry
- Charles Toppin sports master, cricketer
- Philip Turner, history master, children's fiction writer
- Eric William Kevin Walton, engineering lecturer, recipient of the Albert Medal and the Polar Medal
