= Duncan Gordon Boyes =

English Victoria Cross recipient

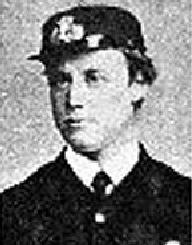
- Duncan Gordon Boyes VC in his midshipman's uniform
- Born: 5 November 1846; Cheltenham, England, United Kingdom
- Died: 26 January 1869 (aged 22); Dunedin, New Zealand
- Burial place: Andersons Bay Cemetery
- Relatives: Thomas James Young VC (brother-in-law)
- Military career
- Allegiance: United Kingdom
- Branch: Royal Navy
- Rank: Midshipman
- Conflicts: Shimonoseki Expedition
- Awards: Victoria Cross

Duncan Gordon Boyes VC (5 November 1846 – 26 January 1869) was an English recipient of the Victoria Cross, the highest and most prestigious award for gallantry in the face of the enemy that can be awarded to British and Commonwealth forces. The award was bestowed upon him for his actions during the Shimonoseki Expedition, Japan in 1864. He was later discharged from naval service as a result of ill-discipline and moved to New Zealand to work on his family's sheep station. Suffering from depression and alcoholism, he committed suicide at the age of 22 in Dunedin.

== Early life ==
Duncan Gordon Boyes was born on 5 November 1846 in Cheltenham, to John and Sabina Boyes, who had married in Hobart, Tasmania. His father was a merchant, and Boyes was one of nine children.

In 1860, Boyes' sister, Louisa Mary, married Thomas James Young, who received a Victoria Cross for his actions at Lucknow, India, in 1857. At least one of his brothers also served in the Royal Navy. Boyes' sister Helen was the wife of M. A. Bayfield.

Boyes completed his schooling at Cheltenham College before joining the Royal Navy at the age of 14. He was assigned to HMS Euryalus, joining the ship in 1862 when it was serving as part of the East Indies station.

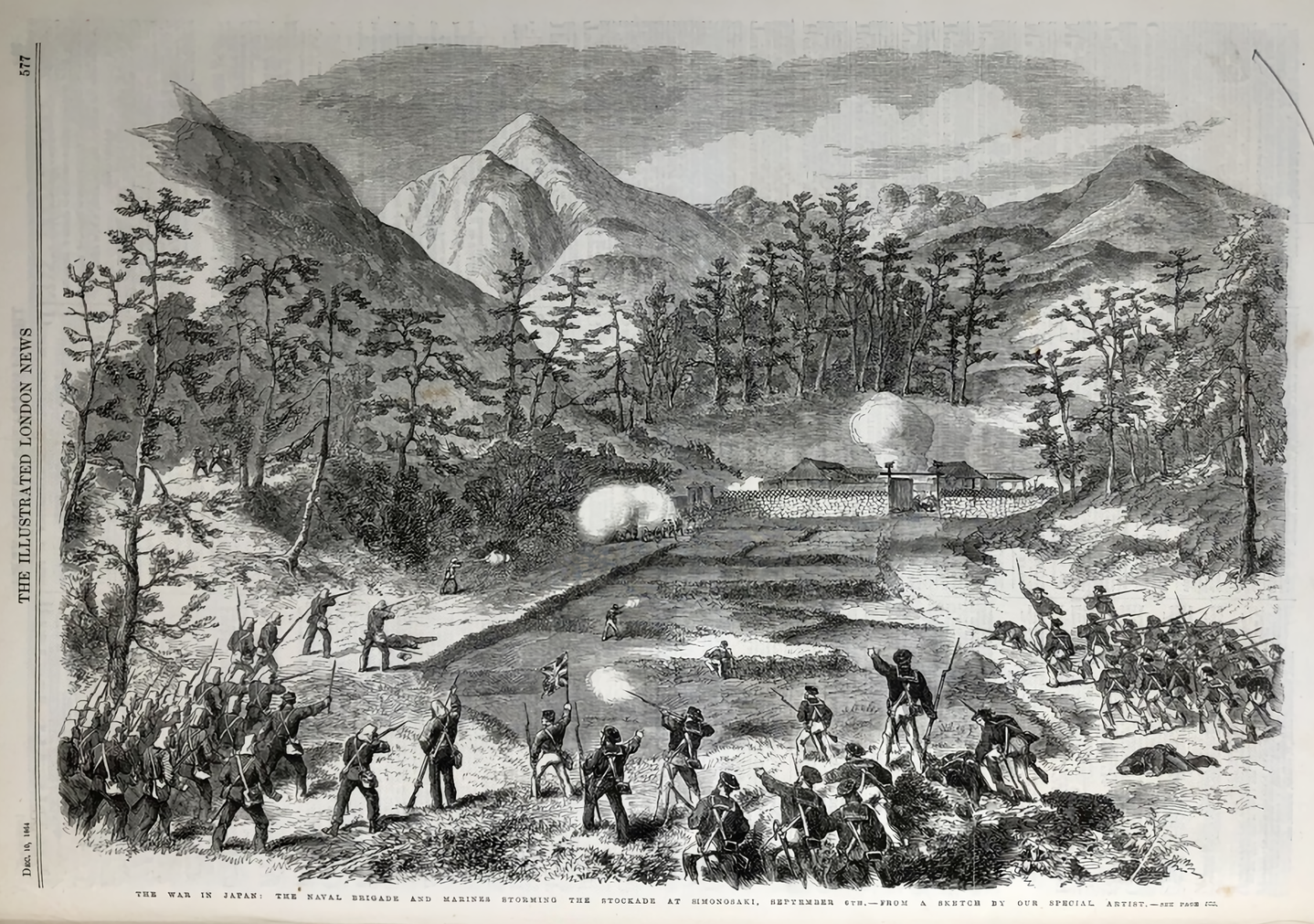
The British Naval Brigade and Royal Marines storm the stockade at Shimonoseki in September 1864. Illustrated London News, 24 December 1864.

== Victoria Cross ==
Boyes received his VC at the age of 17, for his part in action at Shimonoseki, Japan on 6 September 1864. During the fighting, he carried the Queen's Colour as part of the company leading the assault on the Japanese stockade. Boyes was credited with keeping the colours flying despite heavy fire that inflicted numerous casualties. Along with Colour Sergeant Thomas Pride who was badly wounded, Boyes continued pressing forward and only stopped his advance when ordered to do so.

The citation was published in the London Gazette of 21 April 1865 and read:

Duncan Gordon Boyes, Royal Navy, Midshipman of Her Majesty's Ship Euryalus For the conspicuous gallantry, which, according to the testimony of Capt. Alexander CB, at that time Flag Captain to Vice-Admiral Sir Augustus Kuper KCB, Mr. Boyes displayed in the capture of the enemy's stockade. He carried a Colour with the leading company, kept it in advance of all, in the face of the thickest fire, his colour-sergeants having fallen, one mortally, the other dangerously wounded, and he was only detained from proceeding yet further by the orders of his superior officer. The Colour he carried was six times pierced by musket balls.

Sir Ernest Satow mentioned Duncan Boyes in his memoirs entitled A Diplomat in Japan (London, 1921) in the following terms: "Lieutenant Edwards and Crowdy of the Engineers were ahead with a middy [midshipman] named D.G. Boyes, who carried the colours most gallantly; he afterwards received the V.C. for conduct very plucky in one so young."

Boyes, William Seeley, and Thomas Pride were invested with their Victoria Crosses on 22 September 1865 by Admiral Sir Michael Seymour GCB (Commander-in-Chief to Portsmouth) on the Common at Southsea.

== Later life ==
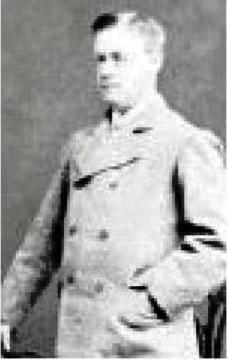
Duncan Boyes V.C. in civilian clothes

After Euralyus was paid off, Boyes was reassigned to HMS Wolverine, a corvette serving in North American waters. On 9 February 1867, he and another midshipman, Marcus McCausland, were court-martialled for breaking into the Naval Yard at Bermuda. On the night of the incident, the two men had been ashore drinking and upon their return had been refused entry at the main gate as they did not have the required passes. Both men admitted they were guilty of the offence and were discharged from the Navy as a result of the incident.

Following this, Boyes suffered from depression and alcoholism. He subsequently moved to New Zealand to join two of his brothers on their sheep station at Kawarau Falls near Queenstown, but after his father died, he suffered a nervous breakdown. On 26 January 1869, Boyes committed suicide jumping to his death from the window of a house in Dunedin. He was aged 22 years and 2 months. The official cause of death was listed as delirium tremens.

He was buried locally in the Dunedin Southern Cemetery with a stone at his head and feet, though on 4 May 1954 the Dunedin branch of the Royal New Zealand Returned Services' Association (RSA), in consequence of his VC, reburied him in the servicemen's section of Andersons Bay Cemetery in Anglican Southern Section, Block 6, Plot 24.

== The medal ==
Between 1978 and 1998, the medal was held by Cheltenham College. The Boyes V.C. sold for 51,700 pounds at auction by Spink, the auctioneers in London, on behalf of Cheltenham College for the purpose of establishing a scholarship in Boyes' name.

Lord Michael Ashcroft bought the medal at the auction in 1998 for his collection. It is now in the Lord Ashcroft Gallery at the Imperial War Museum.

== Commemoration ==
A series of posters of Duncan Boyes VC and other medal recipients was put on view on the Victoria line in London on 11 November 2004.

== See also ==
- Japan–United Kingdom relations
