= St Ninian's School, Moffat =

St Ninian's Preparatory School

Location
- Old Well Road; Moffat, Dumfriesshire, DG10 9AW; Scotland

Information
- Type: Preparatory school
- Established: 1879
- Founder: Arthur J C Dowding & Reverend W H Churchill
- Closed: 1979
- Gender: Boys
- Age: 5 to 13

St Ninian's Preparatory School was a private preparatory school for boys in Moffat, Scotland.

== History ==
St Ninian's Preparatory School for boys was founded in 1879 by Arthur John Caswall Dowding and Reverend William Henry Churchill. Dowding had previously been an Assistant Master for three years at Fettes College in Edinburgh. E. W. Hornung was one of the nine boys with which the school opened at Easter 1879. In 1887, the Reverend John William Rundall, who was Assistant Master at St Ninian's from 1882-1887, became the new owner and headmaster of the school, until his death in 1903.

Following the death of Rundall, aged 44, ownership of the school passed to his widow Constance Ethel Pearse. Her brother, the Reverend Francis Wingate (or Wyngate) ‘Frank’ Pearse (1862-c.1943) became headmaster in 1906, having been headmaster at Harlington Preparatory School, later Penrallt Preparatory School, Llanbedr, Merionethshire, Wales. In 1910, Constance Pearse died, bequeathing the school to another brother, Hugh (an assistant master at the school), who conveyed ownership to his brother Francis. In August 1934 the Reverend Mr Pearse sold the school to Mr D A Gregory and retired. In 1973 Mr Peter G Spencer purchased the school which he sold in 1979.

Hugh Dowding, son of the founder, was born at the school in 1882 and educated there. In 1987, to honour the contribution made by Lord Dowding during the Second World War, the RAF Association in conjunction with the RAF Benevolent Fund, purchased St Ninian's School, his birthplace. The building was renamed Dowding House and restored to provide sheltered housing for former members of the Royal Air Force or their dependents. The driving force behind this project was Irene 'Sandy' Park, a former Women's Auxiliary Air Force officer, and native of Moffat.

A stained-glass window (by Charles Eamer Kempe) from the demolished school chapel, commemorating former St Ninian's pupils who died during the Second Boer War, can be found in the west window of St John's Church (Episcopal) in Moffat. There is a plaque in the church with the names and details of the ten fallen, among them Captain David Younger, VC.

== Notable alumni ==
- Air Chief Marshal Hugh Dowding (1882-1970), Royal Air Force officer; Commander RAF Fighter Command during the Battle of Britain.
- George Findlay (1889-1967), British Army officer, recipient of the Victoria Cross.
- William Gairdner (1873-1928), Christian missionary in Egypt.
- E. W. Hornung (1866-1921), author and poet.
- George Hunt (1916-2011), Royal Navy officer; submarine ace.
- Hector MacLean (1913-2007), Royal Air Force officer; Battle of Britain fighter pilot.
- Donald Mackintosh (1896-1917), British Army officer, recipient of the Victoria Cross.
- David Younger (1871-1900), British Army officer, recipient of the Victoria Cross.
