= John Hart (classicist) =

English classics master at Malvern College (1936–2011)

John Thornton Hart (30 September 1936 – 15 November 2011) was a classics master at Malvern College and winner of the 1975 series of the BBC television series Mastermind. Within English law, Hart is also notable as being a party in the House of Lords case Pepper v Hart, which was a landmark decision in English law concerning the use of legislative history in statutory interpretation. Hart was the first man to win Mastermind, as women won the first three series of the show between 1972 and 1974. He was educated at Rugby School and St John's College, Oxford, where he read Classics. He was a Freemason for 40 years.
