= Chris Murtagh =

English cricketer (born 1984)

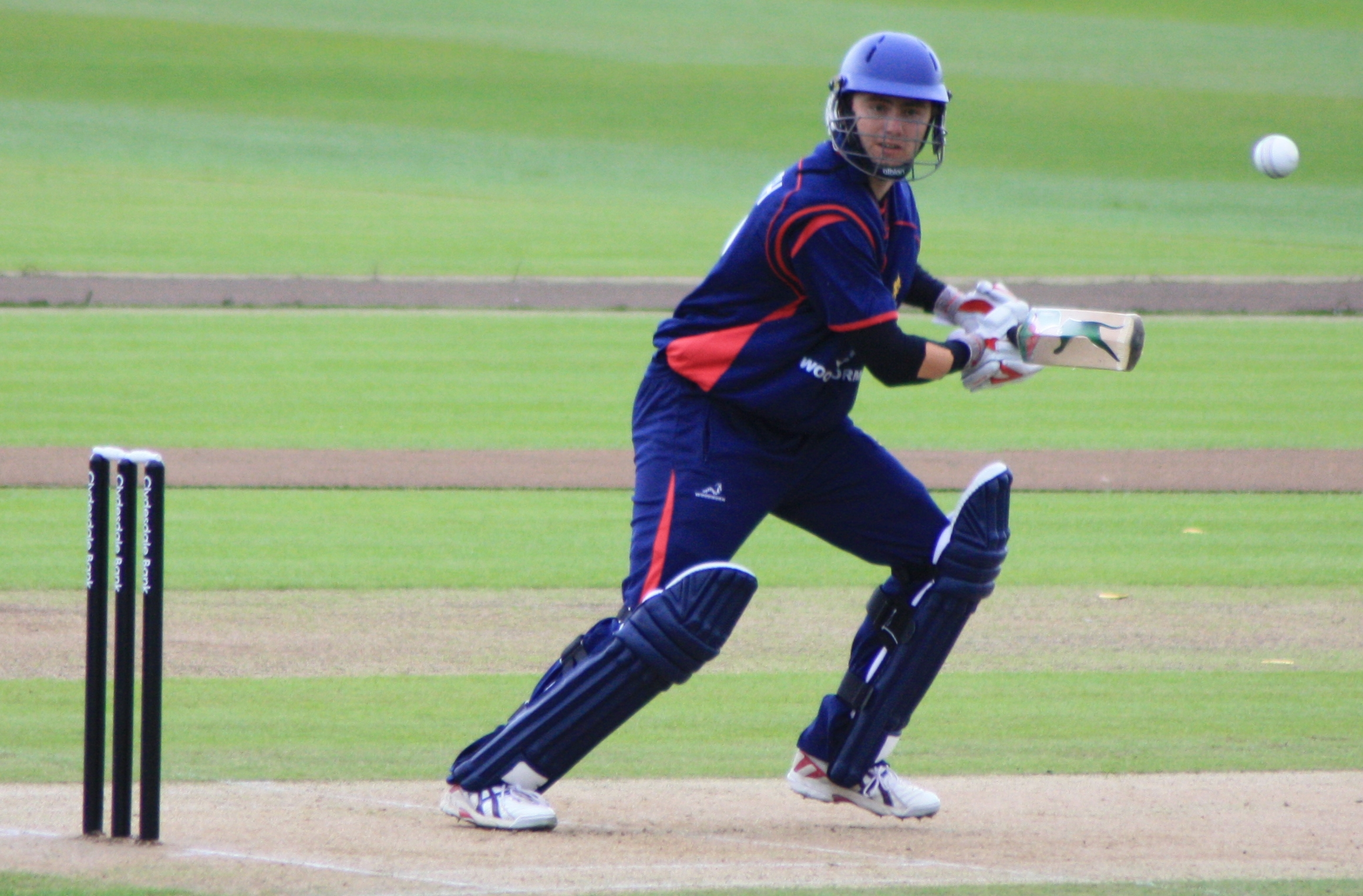

Personal information
- Full name: Christopher Paul Murtagh
- Born: 14 October 1984 (age 42); Lambeth, London
- Height: 5 ft 11 in (1.80 m)
- Batting: Right-handed
- Bowling: Right-arm medium pace
- Role: Batsman
- Relatives: Tim Murtagh (brother); Andy Murtagh (uncle)

Domestic team information
- Years: Team
- 2005–2009: Surrey
- 2010: Unicorns (squad no. 14)
- 2010–2013: Shropshire

Career statistics
| Competition | FC | LA | T20 |
|---|---|---|---|
| Matches | 14 | 10 | 4 |
| Runs scored | 316 | 186 | 33 |
| Batting average | 18.58 | 26.57 | 11.00 |
| 100s/50s | 1/0 | 0/1 | 0/0 |
| Top score | 107 | 74 | 28 |
| Balls bowled | 6 | – | – |
| Wickets | 0 | – | – |
| Bowling average | – | – | – |
| 5 wickets in innings | – | – | – |
| 10 wickets in match | – | – | – |
| Best bowling | – | – | – |
| Catches/stumpings | 9/– | 4/– | 4/– |
- Source: CricketArchive, 25 May 2010

Christopher Paul Murtagh (born 14 October 1984) is an English cricketer who played for Surrey County Cricket Club before being released in 2009. He is a right-handed batsman. Murtagh attended the selective The John Fisher School and made his first-class cricket debut for Loughborough UCCE in 2005, turning out for Surrey in some one-day games later in the season. A prolific season in 2007 earned him his first full contract for the 2008 season. He is the younger brother of Tim Murtagh.

In 2010, Murtagh was selected as one of 21 players to form the first Unicorns squad to take part in the Clydesdale Bank 40 domestic limited overs competition against the regular first-class counties. He played for Shropshire County Cricket Club in the 2010, 2011 and 2013 seasons, having also played club cricket with Reigate Priory Cricket Club.
