= Nigel Draffan =

English cricketer and cricket administrator

Personal information
- Full name: Nigel Gordon Helm Draffan
- Born: 1 September 1950 (age 76); Nakuru, Kenya Colony
- Batting: Right-handed

Domestic team information
- Years: Team
- 1971–1972: Cambridge University

Career statistics
Competition	First-class	List A
Matches	4	2
Runs scored	35	33
Batting average	5.83	16.50
100s/50s	–/–	–/–
Top score	29	33
Catches/stumpings	1/–	–/–
- Source: Cricinfo, 5 October 2020

Nigel Gordon Helm Draffan (born 1 September 1950) is an English former first-class cricketer.

Draffan was in September 1950 born at Nakuru in what was then British-administered Kenya Colony. He was educated in England at Malvern College, before going up to Emmanuel College, Cambridge. While studying at Cambridge, Draffan played first-class cricket on four occasions for Cambridge University in 1971–72, struggling against the county opposition he faced by scoring just 35 runs from 7 innings. In addition to playing first-class cricket for Cambridge, he also represented the university in two List A one-day matches against Leicestershire and Northamptonshire in the 1972 Benson & Hedges Cup, scoring 33 runs. Alongside his cricket, Draffan also played field hockey and rackets for the university for which he gained a blue and half-blue respectively.

Draffan is currently the managing agent for Savills of the Angmering Park estate near Arundel, having previously been estate director for the Goodwood Estate. He is also a trustee of the Arundel Castle Cricket Foundation.
