= Bill Maidlow =

English cricketer (born 1949)

Personal information
- Full name: William John Maidlow
- Born: 15 July 1949 (age 77); Southmead, Bristol, England
- Nickname: Molly
- Height: 5 ft 11 in (1.80 m)
- Batting: Right-handed

Domestic team information
- Years: Team
- 1972: Oxford University

Career statistics
Competition	First-class
Matches	2
Runs scored	53
Batting average	13.25
100s/50s	–/–
Top score	45
Catches/stumpings	2/–
- Source: Cricinfo, 9 June 2020

William 'Bill' John Maidlow (born 15 July 1949) is an English former first-class cricketer.

A right-handed batsman, Maidlow was born at Bristol in July 1949. He was educated at Malvern College, before going up to Brasenose College, Oxford. While studying at Oxford, he made two appearances in first-class cricket for Oxford University at Oxford in 1972, against Nottinghamshire and Essex. He scored 53 runs in his two matches, with a high score of 45.
