= Thomas James Young =

British recipient of the Victoria Cross

Captain Thomas James Young VC
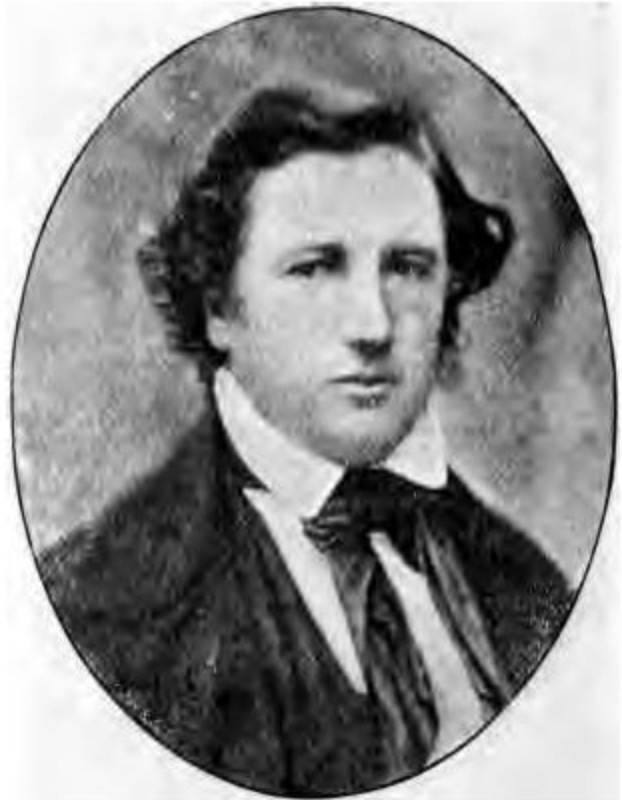
- Born: 1827; Chelsea, Middlesex, England
- Died: 20 March 1869; Caen, France
- Burial place: Cimitiere Protestant, Caen
- Relatives: Duncan Gordon Boyes VC (brother-in-law)
- Military career
- Allegiance: United Kingdom
- Branch: Royal Navy
- Rank: Captain
- Units: HMS Shannon
- Conflicts: Crimean War; Indian Mutiny
- Awards: Victoria Cross; Order of the Medjidieh (Ottoman Empire)

Captain Thomas James Young, VC (1827 – 20 March 1869) was a Royal Navy officer and a recipient of the Victoria Cross, the highest award for gallantry in the face of the enemy that can be awarded to British and Commonwealth forces.

== Details ==
He was approximately 30 years old, and a lieutenant in the Royal Navy, serving with a Naval Brigade from HMS Shannon during the Indian Mutiny when the following deed took place for which he was awarded the VC.

On 16 November 1857 at Lucknow, British India, naval guns were brought up close to the Shah Nujeff mosque, and the gun crews kept up a steady fire in an attempt to breach the walls, while a hail of musket balls and grenades from the mutineers inside the mosque caused heavy casualties. Lieutenant Young moved from gun to gun giving encouragement, and when he and Able Seaman William Hall were the only survivors, all the rest being killed or wounded, Lieutenant Young took the last gunner's place and between them they loaded and fired the gun. The joint citation reads:

Lieutenant (now Commander) Young, late Gunnery Officer of Her Majesty's ship "Shannon," and William Hall, "Captain of the Foretop," of that Vessel, were recommended by the late Captain Peel for the Victoria Cross, for their gallant conduct at a 24-Pounder Gun, brought up to the angle of the Shah Nujjiff, at Lucknow, on the 16th of November, 1857.

He later achieved the rank of captain. He married Louisa Mary Boyes, the sister of Duncan Gordon Boyes, who also won the Victoria Cross.

Young died in Caen, France, and is buried in the Protestant Cemetery there.

His Victoria Cross is displayed at the National Maritime Museum in Greenwich, London.
