= Tim Murtagh =

Irish cricketer

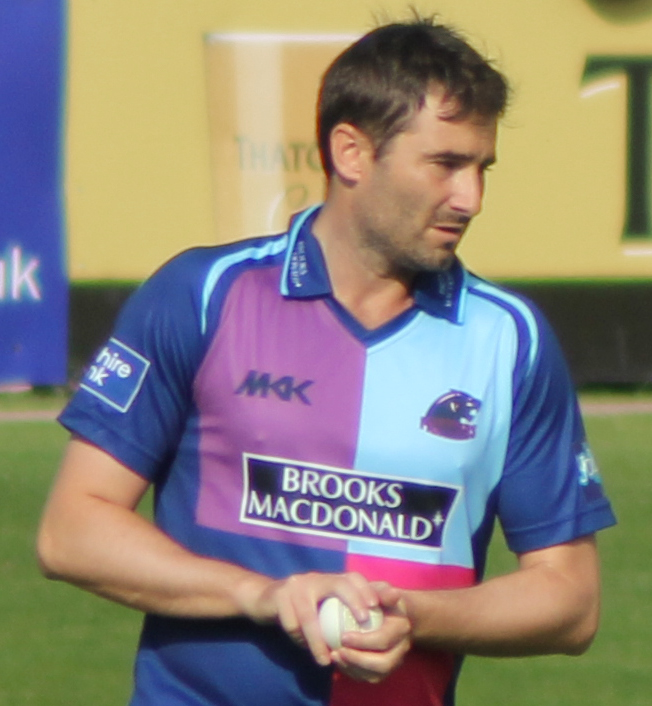

Personal information
- Full name: Timothy James Murtagh
- Born: 2 August 1981 (age 45); Lambeth, London, England
- Height: 6 ft 2 in (1.88 m)
- Batting: Left-handed
- Bowling: Right-arm fast-medium
- Role: Bowler
- Relatives: AJ Murtagh (uncle); CP Murtagh (brother)

International information
- National side: Ireland (2012–2019)
- Test debut (cap 5): 11 May 2018 v Pakistan
- Last Test: 24 July 2019 v England
- ODI debut (cap 38): 23 June 2012 v Australia
- Last ODI: 7 July 2019 v Zimbabwe
- ODI shirt no.: 34
- T20I debut (cap 25): 21 July 2012 v Bangladesh
- Last T20I: 13 March 2016 v Netherlands
- T20I shirt no.: 34

Domestic team information
- Years: Team
- 2000–2006: Surrey
- 2007–2023: Middlesex

Career statistics
Competition	Test	ODI	T20I	FC
Matches	3	58	14	264
Runs scored	109	188	26	4,360
Batting average	27.25	7.83	13.00	17.16
100s/50s	0/1	0/0	0/0	0/11
Top score	54*	23*	12*	74*
Balls bowled	570	3,020	324	46,949
Wickets	13	74	13	959
Bowling average	16.38	30.94	24.92	24.45
5 wickets in innings	1	1	0	40
10 wickets in match	0	0	0	5
Best bowling	5/13	5/21	3/23	7/82
Catches/stumpings	0/–	16/–	3/–	69/–
- Source: ESPNcricinfo, 25 July 2024

Timothy James Murtagh (born 2 August 1981) is a retired English-born Irish cricketer who played for Middlesex County Cricket Club.

He was a left-handed batsman and a right-arm fast-medium bowler who previously represented England in the 2000 ICC Under-19 Cricket World Cup.

Murtagh played for the Surrey county team from 2000 to 2006, then moved to Middlesex, whom he represented from 2007 to 2023.

He first played for Ireland in 2012. In May 2018, he was one of the eleven cricketers to play in Ireland's first Test match, against Pakistan.

In November 2018, he was named the Men's International Player of the Year at the annual Cricket Ireland Awards. The following month, he was one of nineteen players to be awarded a central contract by Cricket Ireland for the 2019 season. In November 2019, Murtagh announced his retirement from international cricket, remaining with Middlesex CCC for two years instead.

== Under-19s career ==
He was part of the England Under-19 cricket team side for 2000 Under-19 World Cup held in Sri Lanka. Murtagh took 16 wickets at an average of 16.31 with the best bowling of 4/29 in three Youth Tests and 12 wickets at an average of 19.33 with the best bowling of 4/26 in 7 List A Internationals for the England Under-19 XI.

== Domestic career ==
He played for Surrey as a backup bowler. After injuries to many of the Surrey bowlers in 2005, he has found himself having to lead the attack on several occasions. Murtagh took figures of 6/24 against Middlesex in the 2005 Twenty20 Cup which at the time that was his best bowling figures in the short form games.

Murtagh played in just two of Surrey's County Championship matches in the 2006 season and as a result, he searched for opportunities with other clubs. Across seven seasons at Surrey, Murtagh played 34 first-class matches scoring 874 runs at an average of 32.37 and taking 68 wickets at an average of 37.72. He also played 65 List-A matches in which he took 79 wickets at an average of 32.63.

He signed a two-year contract with Middlesex in December 2006 and since moving to Middlesex, Murtagh's bowling average has significantly dropped. As of September 2020, he has taken 725 first-class wickets at an average of 23.74 in 186 games for Middlesex, almost 14 runs per wicket better than his figures at Surrey. Similarly his bowling average in List A matches for Middlesex is six runs less than it was for Surrey.

In 2019, he stopped playing international cricket, when he was "forced to make a decision between turning out for Middlesex or Ireland, as Ireland cricketers were no longer allowed play in county cricket as non-overseas players due to their recently gained status as a Full Member of the ICC." When a grace-period for Irish players expired in 2019, he retired from international cricket to continue playing for Middlesex. In November 2019, he announced a two-year contract extension with Middlesex, signing on to play all formats for 2020. He was not playing on the county circuit in 2020, as cricket had been suspended due to COVID-19.

In April 2022, in the opening round of matches in the 2022 County Championship, Murtagh took his 900th wicket in first-class cricket.

On 18 September 2023, Murtagh announced that he would retire from professional cricket at the end of the 2023 county season and it was confirmed that he would move into a coaching role at Middlesex.

== International career ==
A conversation with Sussex and Ireland batsman Ed Joyce in 2011 led Murtagh to seriously consider qualifying for Ireland as his grandfather was born in Dublin. He applied for Irish citizenship in October that year, which was granted in January 2012.

Ireland's first engagement after Murtagh qualified was the 2012 ICC World Twenty20 Qualifier held in the UAE in March. Murtagh was named as a reserve in case any of the 14 players in the squad were injured. He made his debut against Australia in an abandoned One Day International (ODI) match at Civil Service Cricket Club, Belfast, in June 2012. He was also part of the Irish squad to play against Afghanistan where he played his second ODI in Dublin in July 2012. He made his t20I debut against Bangladesh. He scored 3 runs but did not pick up a wicket in three overs.

Murtagh was selected in the Cricket Ireland squad for the 2015 Cricket World Cup but broke a foot on 7 January, and had to withdraw on medical advice. He was replaced in the squad by Max Sorensen.

In May 2015, Tim Murtagh and fellow cricketer Ed Joyce announced their retirement from T20 cricket. In July 2019, in the second ODI against Zimbabwe, Murtagh took his first five-wicket haul in ODIs.

=== Test cricket ===
He was named in a fourteen-man squad for Ireland's first ever Test match, which was played against Pakistan in May 2018, with Murtagh going on to make his Test debut in the match. Ireland won the toss and elected to field, with Murtagh bowling the first delivery for Ireland in Test cricket.

In January 2019, he was named in Ireland's squad for their one-off Test against Afghanistan in India. During the match, he became the first number 11 batsman to record scores of more than 25 in each innings of a Test match, with scores of 54 not out and 27.

Murtagh played in Ireland's one-off Test match against England at Lord's in July 2019. On the opening morning of the match, he took his first five-wicket haul in Test cricket, the first such haul by a bowler for Ireland.

About leaving international cricket, he said, he still hoped to "help out and be involved in some capacity in the future" with the Irish team.

== Personal life ==
Murtagh attended the John Fisher School in Purley, London.

His uncle Andy and younger brother Chris also played first-class cricket representing Hampshire and Surrey respectively.

He applied for Irish citizenship in October 2011, which was granted in January 2012.

== Awards ==
- NBC Denis Compton Award 2001

== See also ==
- List of Middlesex County Cricket Club List A cricketers#M
