= Old Malvernians Cricket Club =

Old Malvernians Cricket Club is an amateur cricket club for the alumni of Malvern College. For more than a century it has been a tradition to travel to Sussex in the summer on an annual cricket tour, playing regularly with the Old Eastbournians, Lancing, Uppingham Rovers and Eastbourne Town.

The club has competed in the annual Cricketer Cup since the tournament's inception in 1967. Up to and including 2009, there had been 43 finals and Old Malvernians had appeared in 11, winning 6, making them the second most prolific finalist after Old Tonbridgians. They were second out of 33 in the Cricketer Cup Order of Merit for the percentage of matches won since 1967. They were also joint top with Old Tonbridgians for the number of club members participating in the Cricketer Cup who have played county cricket.

In 2011, Old Malvernians won their eighth and second successive final of the Cricketer Cup, defeating Eton Ramblers by 6 wickets with 18 overs remaining, after having beaten Oundle Rovers by 73 runs the previous year.

Notable members of the club have included Gavin Franklin, Mark Hardinges, Roger Tolchard, Jeff Tolchard, Jonathan Wileman, Mark Vermeulen and Ivan Johnson.
