= Hector MacLean (RAF officer) =

Charles Hector MacLean
- Born: 9 December 1913; Glasgow
- Died: 19 July 2007 (aged 93)
- Military career
- Allegiance: United Kingdom
- Branch: Royal Air Force
- Service years: 1938–1950
- Rank: Wing commander
- Service number: 90166
- Unit: No. 602 Squadron RAF
- Commands: Commanding Officer – No 3602 Fighter Control Unit
- Conflicts: World War II: Battle of Britain
- Awards: AE & Clasp
- Other work: Lawyer, Author

Wing Commander Hector MacLean AE* (9 December 1913 – 19 July 2007) was a Battle of Britain fighter pilot.

== Biography ==
MacLean was educated at St Ninian's Preparatory School, Moffat; Canford School, Dorset and the University of Glasgow, from where he graduated Bachelor of Laws in 1935.

== RAF career ==
He joined the Royal Air Force in November 1935, after his graduation from university. He was commissioned in March 1936, and joined No. 602 (City of Glasgow) Squadron flying Hawker Hinds, and later Hawker Harts.

By 1939, 602 Squadron were flying Spitfires and MacLean flew with the squadron throughout the Battle of Britain. He claimed two shared kills – a Heinkel He 111 on 22 December 1939 and a Junkers Ju 88 in July 1940.

On 26 August 1940, MacLean was severely wounded over the English Channel, but managed to return and belly-land his badly damaged aircraft at RAF Tangmere. His injuries resulted in the loss of his right leg below the knee and a lengthy hospitalisation. He was then unable to continue flying, and became a fighter controller and scrambled the intercept when Rudolf Hess made his lone flight to Scotland on 10 May 1941.

He retired on transfer to the reserve on 1 April 1950 and relinquished his RAF commission on 2 December 1957.

== Postwar career ==
He joined his family's law firm after the war and in 1999 wrote Fighters in Defence, Memories of the Glasgow Squadron. One of the longest lived Battle of Britain veterans, he died in 2007 aged 93.

MacLean is survived by his three sons Donald, Marcus, Charles and daughter Jane and his nine grandchildren.
