= George Chesterton =

English cricketer

Personal information
- Full name: George Herbert Chesterton
- Born: 15 July 1922; Fenton, Stoke-on-Trent, Staffordshire, England
- Died: 3 November 2012 (aged 90); Great Malvern, Worcestershire, England
- Batting: Right-handed
- Bowling: Right-arm medium

Domestic team information
- Years: Team
- 1949: Oxford University
- 1950–1966: MCC
- 1950–1957: Worcestershire

Career statistics
Competition	First-class
Matches	72
Runs scored	598
Batting average	8.79
100s/50s	0/0
Top score	43
Balls bowled	14,017
Wickets	263
Bowling average	22.78
5 wickets in innings	18
10 wickets in match	1
Best bowling	7/14
Catches/stumpings	37/–
- Source: CricketArchive, 13 October 2008

George Herbert Chesterton MBE (15 July 1922 – 3 November 2012) was an English cricketer who played first-class cricket between 1949 and 1966. The bulk of his appearances were for Worcestershire, whom he represented between 1950 and 1957. He was capped by the county in 1950. Very much a specialist bowler, he never reached 50 in over 100 first-class innings.

== Early life and career ==
Chesterton was educated at Malvern College and Brasenose College, Oxford. He made his first-class debut in 1948, representing Free Foresters in a drawn match against Oxford University at The University Parks. He made 29 not out in his only innings, and took two wickets, including that of future South Africa Test player Clive van Ryneveld. Although that was his only first-class appearance of the season, he did also represent Cornwall twice against the Surrey Second XI in August, something he would do twice more in August 1949.

That 1949 season saw Chesterton play frequently for the Oxford side, and his final aggregate of 46 wickets was the highest he managed in any summer, as was his total of four five-wicket innings hauls. His best innings return that season was the 6–11 he claimed against Free Foresters in late May; this game also saw him make his highest score of 43. In early July he played against Cambridge University in the University Match at Lord's, though he took only one wicket as Oxford went down to a seven-wicket defeat.

Chesterton's 1950 season began with a match against Oxford at Lord's, and he also represented MCC against Ireland in Dublin at the end of the season, but the year was most notable for his first summer of county cricket with Worcestershire. He took 38 first-class wickets in all (32 in England and six in Ireland), twice taking six wickets in an innings: 6–61 versus Lancashire in early August and 6–59 against Somerset later that same month.

In 1951 Chesterton played only once, but between 1952 and 1957 he made about half a dozen appearances a year for Worcestershire, generally picking up 20 or 30 wickets each season, as well as continuing to take the trip to Ireland with MCC in 1952, 1954 and 1956. It was on the 1956 tour that he recorded his career-best innings return, taking 7–14. He followed that up with 3–38 in the second innings to record his only ten-wicket match haul.

Chesterton ended his county cricket career after 1957, but he did have one final game for Free Foresters against Oxford in 1961, and continued to accompany MCC to Ireland well into the 1960s. His final first-class game came in that fixture in September 1966, but his farewell to cricket was not a success despite MCC's victory: Chesterton made 0 in both innings and did not take a wicket in 20 overs of bowling.

== Later career ==
Chesterton wrote a book on coaching for young people with Alan Duff, entitled Your Book of Cricket. He also co-wrote Oxford and Cambridge Cricketers with Cambridge blue and England Test player Hubert Doggart. In 1991, he founded The Chesterton Cup, an annual cricket competition between schools in the English Midlands. Schools which regularly participate include RGS Worcester (record five times winner), Cheltenham College, Malvern College and Monmouth School. In 2011, he was appointed president of the Cricketer Cup.

Outside cricket, Chesterton worked at Malvern College, the school he had attended as a boy, until 1982, becoming deputy headteacher. In 1990 was published Malvern College: 125 Years, a book which he wrote. In 2006, the Malvernian Society held a dinner in his honour at the college to celebrate his 70-year association with Malvern. He wrote a book, called Also Flew, about his war-time service in the RAF during the Second World War; and Andrew Murtagh has written a biography about him called A Remarkable Man. He died aged 90 on 3 November 2012.
