= George Findlay =

Scottish Victoria Cross recipient (1889-1967)

- Born: 20 August 1889; Balloch, Dunbartonshire, Scotland
- Died: 26 June 1967 (aged 77); Helensburgh, Dunbartonshire, Scotland
- Burial place: Kilmaronock Churchyard, near Gartocharn
- Military career
- Allegiance: United Kingdom
- Branch: British Army
- Rank: Colonel
- Service number: 12396
- Units: Royal Engineers
- Conflicts: World War I World War II
- Awards: Victoria Cross; Military Cross and Bar
- Other work: Deputy Lieutenant

Colonel George de Cardonnel Elmsall Findlay VC MC & Bar (20 August 1889 – 26 June 1967) was a Scottish recipient of the Victoria Cross, the highest and most prestigious award for gallantry in the face of the enemy that can be awarded to British and Commonwealth forces.

== Biography ==
Born in Cardross, Dunbartonshire in 1889. He was educated at St Ninian's Prep School, Moffat and Harrow School. He was one of four brothers who enlisted in WW1. His brother Robert was killed in the Quintinshill Rail disaster

Findlay was commissioned into the Royal Engineers in January 1910. He was awarded a Military Cross for gallantry at the Battle of Passchendale and was mentioned in despatches. Following this which he took command of 409 (Lowland) Field Company, a territorial company in June 1917.

In September 1921 Findlay married Dorothy Gordon at St Ninian's Episcopal Church in Glasgow. The marriage was later dissolved and he married Nellie Constance Barclay Clark in 1959.

== VC details ==
He was 29 years old, and an acting major in the 409 (Lowland) Field Company, Corps of Royal Engineers, British Army during the First World War when he was awarded the VC.

On 4 November 1918 during the forcing of the Sambre-Oise Canal at the lock south of Catillon, France, Major Findlay was with the leading bridging and assaulting parties which came under heavy fire and the advance was stopped. Nevertheless, he collected what men he could and repaired the bridge, under incessant fire. Although wounded he continued with his task and after two unsuccessful efforts managed to place the bridge in position across the lock and was the first man across, remaining at this dangerous post until further work was completed.

The family story goes that the reason Major Findlay crossed safely was because he was a slow runner. The Germans overcompensated their aim and thus missed him as he led his men across the bridge.

== Further information ==
He later served in World War II and was granted the honorary rank of colonel. He became deputy lieutenant of the County of Dumbarton in 1957.

Findlay died in June 1967 is buried at Kilmaronock Church, near Gartocharn, West Dunbartonshire, Scotland.

== Medal ==
His Victoria Cross is displayed at the Royal Engineers Museum, Chatham, Kent.

== Bibliography ==
- The Register of the Victoria Cross. This England. 1997. ISBN 0-906324-03-3.
- Gliddon, Gerald (2000). VCs of the First World War - The Final Days 1918. Sutton Publishing. ISBN 0-7509-2485-3.
- The Register of the Victoria Cross (This England, 1997)
- The Sapper VCs (Gerald Napier, 1998)
- Scotland's Forgotten Valour (Graham Ross, 1995)
