= David Younger =

Recipient of the Victoria Cross (1871–1900)

David Younger VC
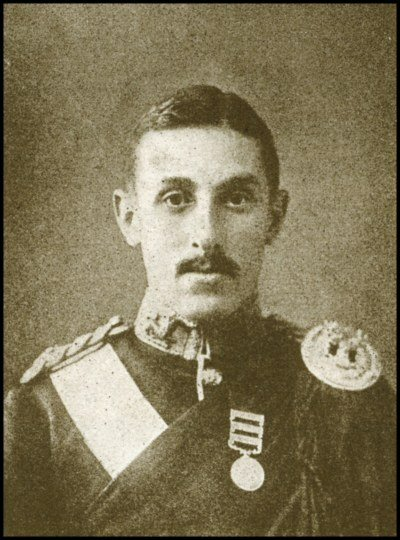
- Born: 17 March 1871; Edinburgh, Scotland
- Died: 11 July 1900 (aged 29) †; Krugersdorp, South Africa
- Burial place: Krugersdorp Cemetery
- Military career
- Allegiance: United Kingdom
- Branch: British Army
- Service years: 1893 – 1900
- Rank: Captain
- Units: The Gordon Highlanders
- Conflicts: Tirah Campaign; Chitral Expedition; Second Boer War †
- Awards: Victoria Cross

Captain David Reginald Younger, VC (17 March 1871 – 11 July 1900) was a Scottish recipient of the Victoria Cross, the highest and most prestigious award for gallantry in the face of the enemy that can be awarded to British and Commonwealth forces.

== Background and early military career ==
He was the son of David Younger (1844–1883) and his wife Menie Isadora Younger (1849–1931). His father died when he was only 12 years old.

Younger was educated at St Ninian's School, Moffat and Malvern College (1885 – 1890). He was commissioned in 1891 and transferred to the Gordon Highlanders on 23 December 1893. Promoted to lieutenant during the mid 1890s, he left for active service in South Africa following the outbreak of the Second Boer War in October 1899, and was promoted to captain on 14 December 1899.

== Details ==
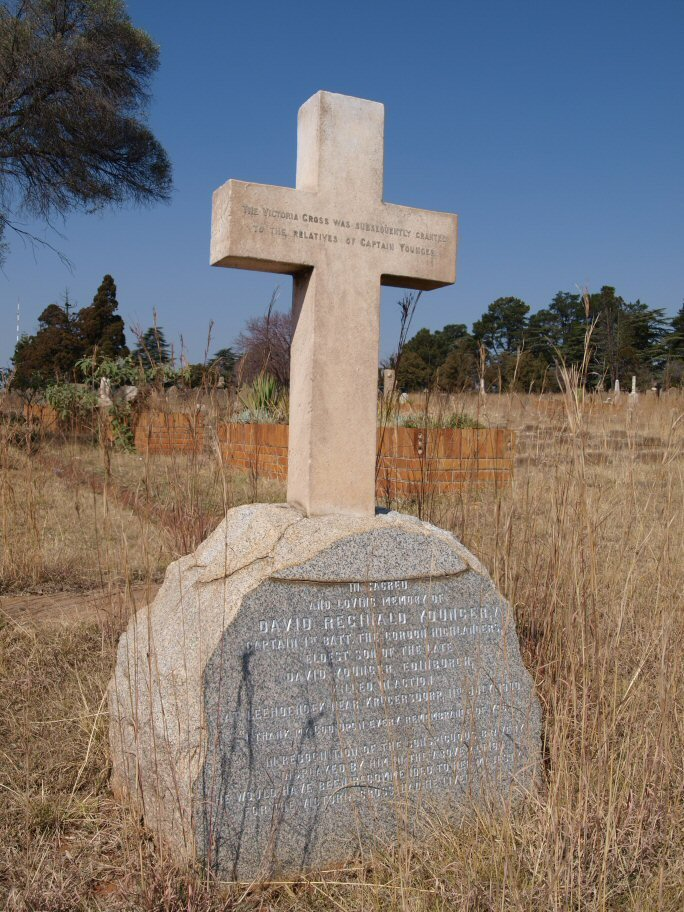
Gravestone for Younger at the Burgershoop Cemetery in Krugersdorp

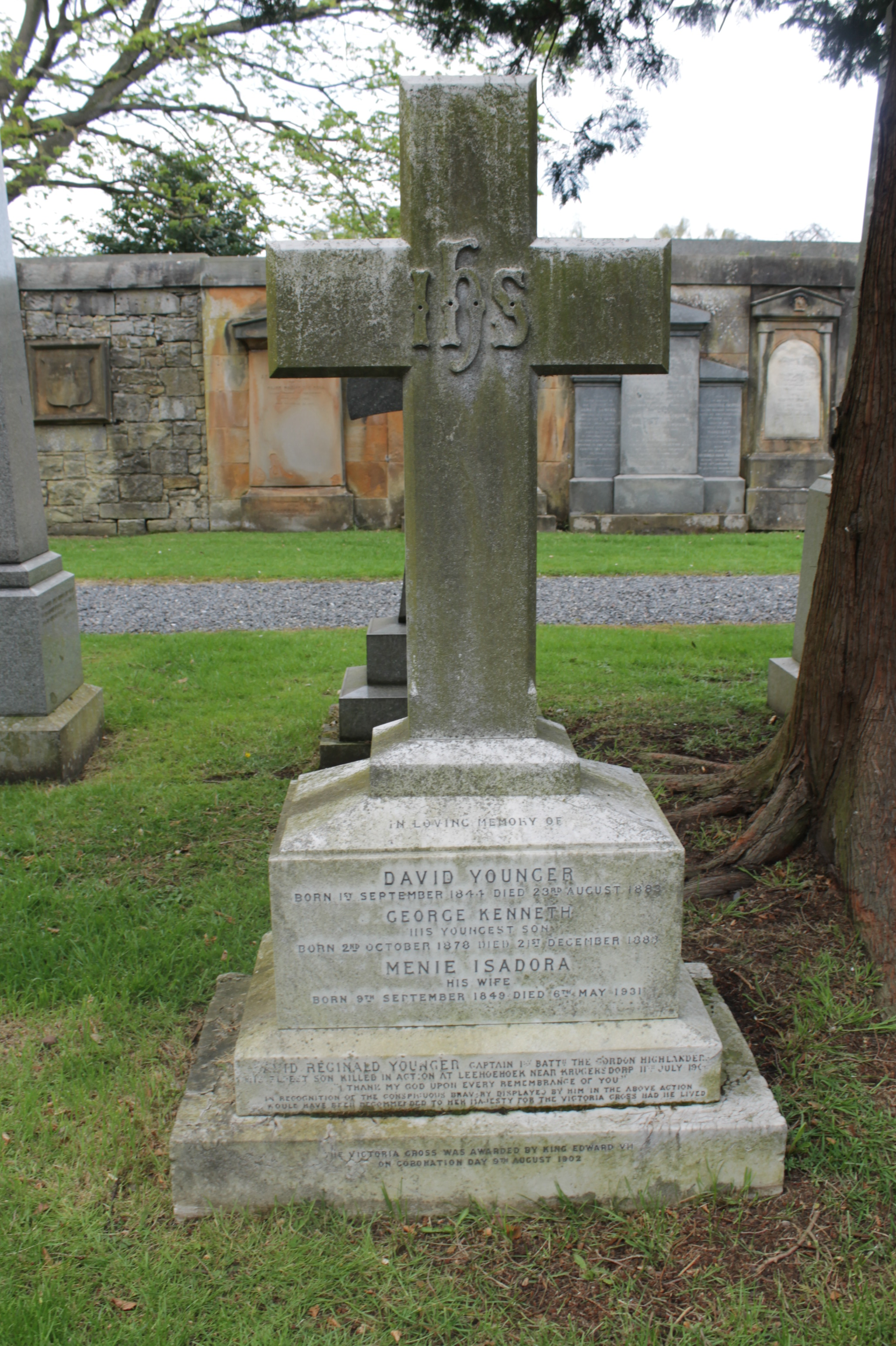
The family grave of David Younger, Dean Cemetery

Younger was 29 years old, and a captain in the 1st Battalion, the Gordon Highlanders, British Army during the Second Boer War when the deed described below took place near Krugersdorp for which he was awarded the Victoria Cross (posthumously) after he died of injuries received during the Battle of Dwarsvlei on 11 July 1900: The Gordon Highlanders under Major-General Smith-Dorrien were ordered to march from Krugersdorp towards Hekpoot. About 15 km from Krugersdorp they were encountered by a commando under Vecht-Generaal Oosthuizen who opened fire from mountain ridges above the road. The battle was fierce and it was only after dark that the British managed to extricate their guns, wagons and wounded and limped back to Krugersdorp. The engagement was described by Major-General Horace Smith-Dorrien as their 'most trying fight of the whole war'.

His citation in the London Gazette reads:

This Officer, during the action near Krugersdorp, on the 11th July, 1900, volunteered for and took out the party which successfully dragged a Royal Artillery waggon under cover of a small kopje, though exposed to a very heavy and accurate fire at only 850 yards range. He also accompanied the second party of volunteers who went out to try and bring in one of the guns. During the attempt he was mortally wounded, dying shortly afterwards. His cool and gallant conduct was the admiration of all who witnessed it.

The Victoria Cross was awarded by King Edward VII on his coronation day, 9 August 1902, the king giving the medal to his widowed mother. D R Younger is also memorialised on his parents grave in Dean Cemetery in west Edinburgh.
