= 1973 John Player League =

- Administrator: Test and County Cricket Board
- Cricket format: Limited overs cricket (40 overs per innings)
- Tournament format: League
- Champions: Kent (2nd title)
- Participants: 17
- Matches: 136
- Most runs: 668 John Hampshire (Yorkshire)
- Most wickets: 28 Dennis Marriott (Middlesex)

The 1973 John Player League was the fifth competing of what was generally known as the Sunday League. The competition was won for the second consecutive year by Kent County Cricket Club.

== Standings ==
Team	Pld	W	T	L	N/R	A	Pts	R/R
Kent (C)	16	12	0	2	0	2	50	4.808
Yorkshire	16	11	0	5	0	0	44	4.231
Hampshire	16	9	0	4	1	2	39	4.756
Lancashire	16	8	0	4	3	1	36	4.314
Leicestershire	16	8	0	6	0	2	34	4.018
Gloucestershire	16	7	0	6	1	2	31	4.543
Middlesex	16	7	0	7	0	2	30	3.901
Sussex	16	7	0	7	0	2	30	4.3
Essex	16	7	0	8	0	1	29	4.293
Surrey	16	6	1	6	0	3	29	4.428
Somerset	16	5	0	7	1	3	24	3.976
Derbyshire	16	5	0	8	1	2	23	3.999
Glamorgan	16	5	0	9	1	1	22	3.763
Nottinghamshire	16	5	0	9	0	2	22	4.329
Warwickshire	16	4	0	8	1	3	20	4.543
Worcestershire	16	4	1	9	2	0	20	4.669
Northamptonshire	16	4	0	9	1	2	19	3.978
Team marked (C) finished as champions. Source: CricketArchive

== See also ==
Sunday League
