= M. A. Bayfield =

British priest and scholar (1852–1922)

Matthew Albert Bayfield (17 June 1852 in Kings Norton, Worcestershire – 2 August 1922 in Hertford) was an English classical scholar, author, headmaster, clergyman and spiritualist. Bayfield is best known for his commentaries on classical Greek texts as well his writing on the subject of poetry. His works include The Measures Of The Poets (1919) and A Study of Shakespeare's Versification (1920). Bayfield collaborated with Walter Leaf and A. W. Verrall on numerous commentaries on the works of Sophocles, Homer and Euripides.

After studying classics at Clare College, Cambridge, Bayfield taught at Malvern College where he composed the school song, Carmen Malvernense. Later he became headmaster of Eastbourne College and Christ College, Brecon, and rector of Hertingfordbury, Hertfordshire. Despite being a clergyman, he was a keen spiritualist, believing that "everyone is a spiritualist who is not a materialist, and Christianity itself is essentially a spiritualistic religion". Bayfield was interested in parapsychology and was a member of the Society for Psychical Research. He was a friend of William F. Barrett and proofread his book On the Threshold of the Unseen.

== Personal life ==
Bayfield's wife Helen was the sister of Duncan Boyes, who won the Victoria Cross at Shimonoseki in 1864.
