= Malvern College =

Independent school in Worcestershire, England

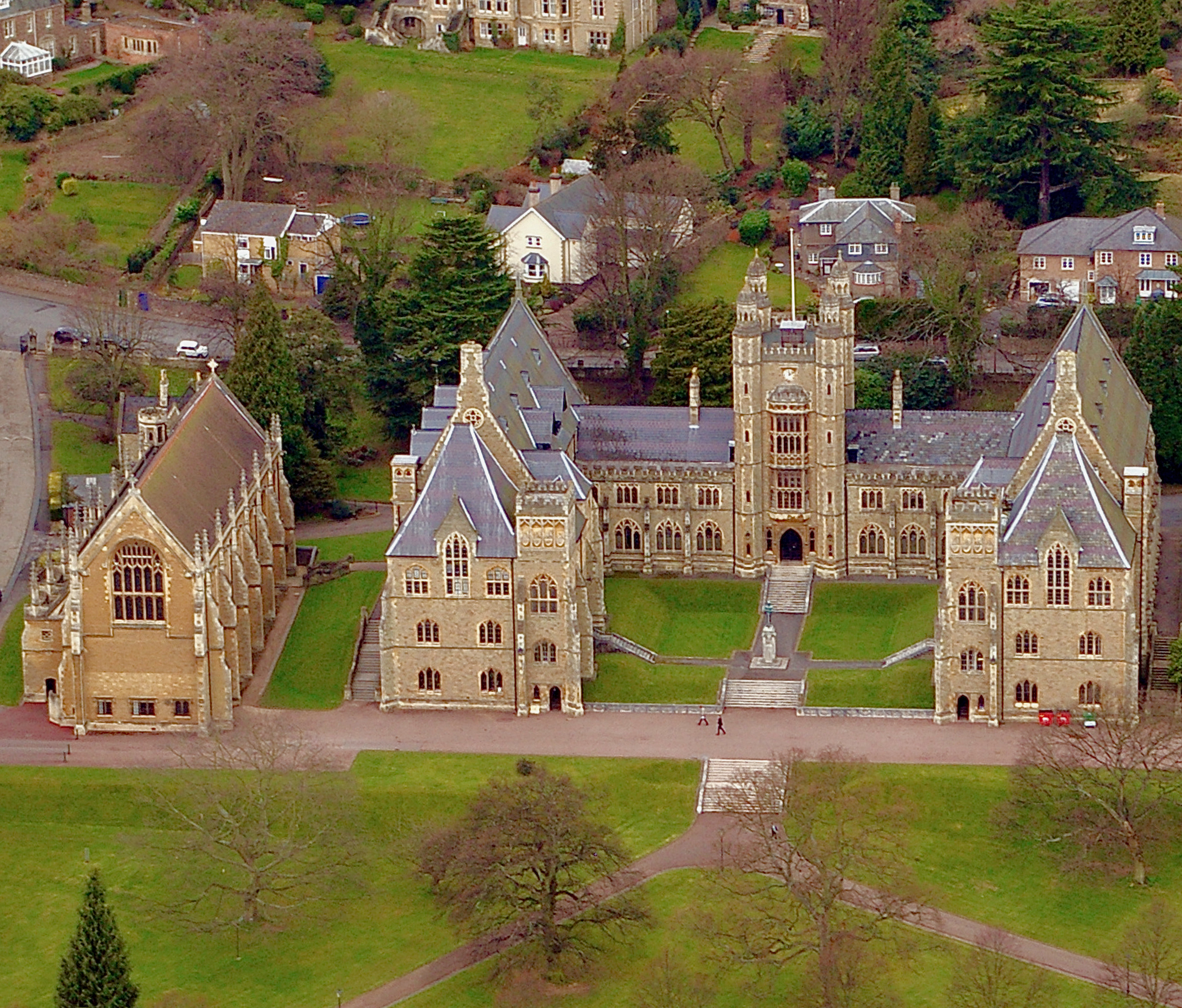
- Aerial view of main college building (right) and chapel (left)

Location
- College Road; Malvern, Worcestershire, WR14 3DF; United Kingdom; 52°06′15″N 2°19′34″W

Information
- Type: Public School; Private boarding and day school
- Motto: Sapiens qui prospicit (Wise is the person who looks ahead)
- Established: 1865
- Local authority: Worcestershire
- Department for Education URN: 117017 Tables
- Chairman of Council: Jonathan Penrice
- Headmaster: Keith Metcalfe
- Gender: Coeducational
- Age: 3 to 18
- Enrolment: 640 (2025)
- Houses: 11
- Publication: The Malvernian
- School fees: £59,295 for boarding, £40,245 for day pupils
- Alumni: Old Malvernians (OMs)
- School song: Carmen Malvernense
- Website: www.malverncollege.org.uk

Malvern College is a coeducational English public school (private, fee-charging school for boarders and day pupils) in Malvern, Worcestershire, England, and is a member of the Rugby Group and of the Headmasters' and Headmistresses' Conference. Founded in 1865, the college has remained on the same campus since its establishment, near the town centre of Great Malvern covering some 250 acres (101 ha) on the lower slopes of the Malvern Hills. Its presence in Malvern has only been interrupted by war; during World War II the campus was requisitioned by the government for military research and the college was relocated, firstly to Blenheim Palace in Oxfordshire in 1939, and then in 1942 to Harrow School. At the 24 July 2025 inspection 640 pupils aged between 13 and 19 were enrolled at the school. It has a history of innovation in education practice; it became fully coeducational in 1992, expanded the pupil age range from 13–18 to 3–18, and adopted a mixed model of accommodating both boarders and day pupils. The college operates overseas campuses in China, Egypt, Hong Kong and Tokyo which opened in September 2023. The college celebrated its 160th anniversary in 2025.

Among the alumni of the college are the Nobel laureates Francis William Aston, Frederick Sanger and James Meade; the novelist C. S. Lewis, two prime ministers of the British Commonwealth, Godfrey Huggins, 1st Viscount Malvern and Najib Razak; two holders of the Victoria Cross, Kenneth Muir and David Younger; the Olympic gold medalist Arnold Jackson, and other notable persons from various fields including military figures, businessmen, journalists, a Speaker of the House of Commons and a Chief Medical Officer for England.

== History ==
Situated in the Malvern Hills, the school's location owes much to Malvern's emergence in the nineteenth century as a fashionable spa resort, appreciated for its unpolluted air and the healing qualities of its famous spring water. The school opened its doors for the first time on 25 January 1865 with twenty-four boys, of whom eleven were day boys, six masters and two houses, named Mr McDowall's (No.1) and Mr Drew's (No.2). The new school expanded quickly: a year later, there were sixty-four boys; by 1875, there were 200 on the roll and five boarding houses; and by the end of the 19th century, the numbers had risen to more than 400 boys and ten houses. The school was one of the twenty-four public schools listed in the Public Schools Yearbook of 1889 and was incorporated by royal charter in 1928.

The school song, "Carmen Malvernense", was written and composed by two masters, M. A. Bayfield and R. E. Lyon. It was first sung on speech day in 1888. The same song became the school song of Eastbourne College when Bayfield became headmaster there in 1895, though presumably with a change of title. In 1909, Henry Morgan began the construction of his first motor car in the engineering workshop at the college, which led to the establishment of the Morgan Motor Company.

Further expansion of pupil numbers and buildings continued between the end of the First World War in 1918 and the start of the Second World War in 1939. A total of 715 former pupils were killed in both World Wars. Two of seven former pupils who flew in the Battle of Britain were killed in action. The dead are commemorated in two memorials at the college: a statue and a library.

=== World War II ===
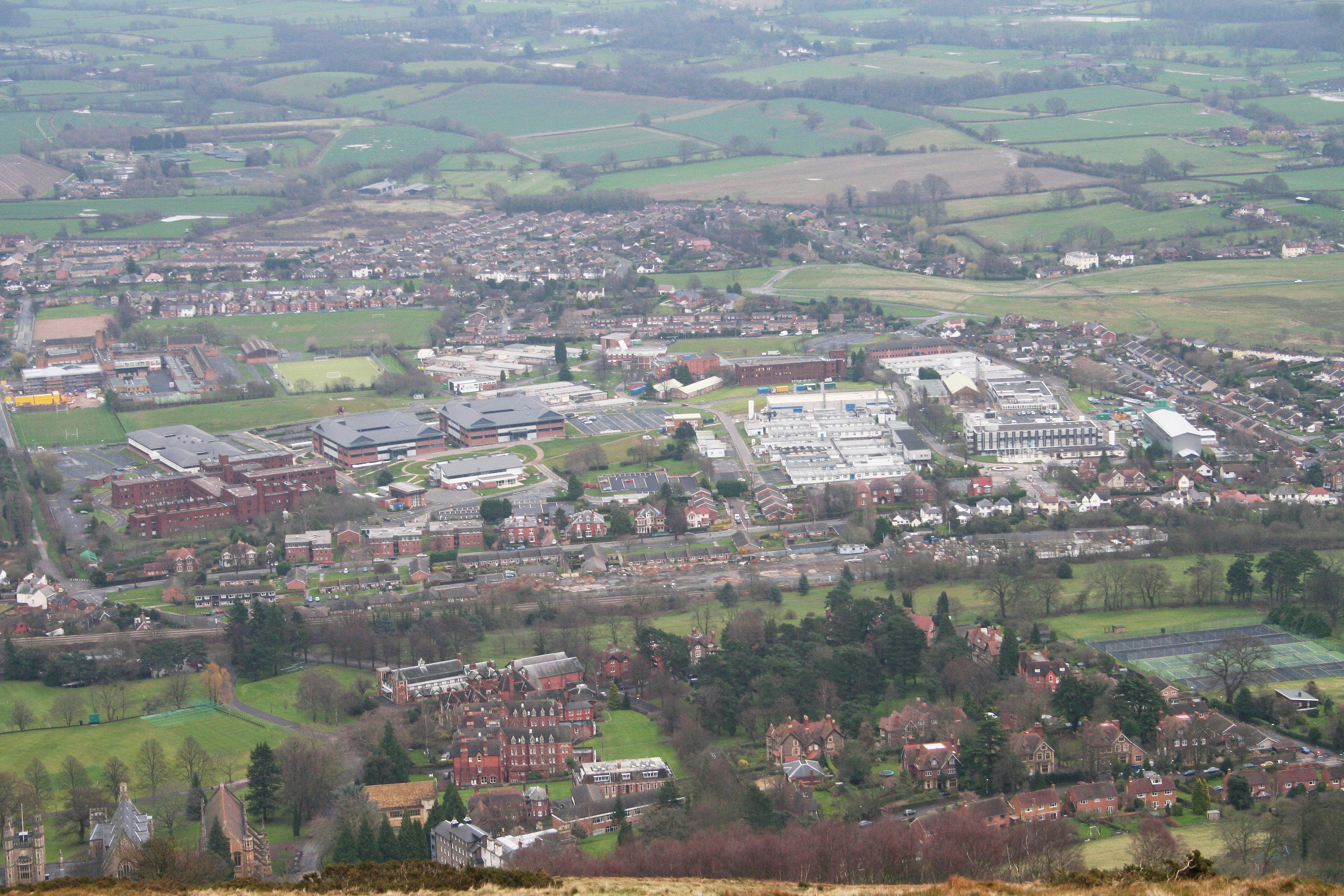
The campus of Malvern College (foreground) with the QinetiQ facility on former college land in the background

During World War II, the college premises were requisitioned by the Admiralty between October 1939 and July 1940, and the school temporarily relocated to Blenheim Palace in Woodstock 8.5 miles (13.7 km) north of Oxford. In 1942, its premises were again needed for governmental use. On this occasion, for greater safety from German strategic bombing, the Telecommunications Research Establishment (TRE), was moved from the English Channel coast at Worth Matravers for the development of H2S airborne radar. "Within six weeks a huge steel-girdered workshop with 14” brick walls have been roofed and equipped, and a large canteen capable of feeding 1,500 people at least at one sitting has been completed, the whole of the grass space between the Science Schools and No.3 was bristling with huts, and in many parts of the grounds strange buildings of a special design rose up." Thousands of local people were engaged in the logistics and the supply of electricity to the town was upgraded from Gloucester and Worcester. The arrival of TRE saw the college's second relocation and from May 1942 to July 1946 the school was housed with Harrow School near London. The TRE installations in the college were visited on 19 July 1944 by King George VI and Queen Elizabeth. A nine-minute film of their tour of the premises is part of a collection at the Imperial War Museum.

Since the occupation of the college by the Ministry of Defence in 1942, research and development into defence physics and electronics have been the major sources of employment in Malvern. Malvern Hills Science Park was built in 1999 and is now home to over 30 science and technological businesses. Privatised by the government in 2001, QinetiQ, the successor to the government's original research facility, continues defence research and technology on former college land and continues to be the town's largest single employer and a key company in Worcestershire.

=== Later 20th and 21st centuries ===
In 1965, the college celebrated the centenary of its foundation with a visit by Queen Elizabeth The Queen Mother and Harold Macmillan, the recently retired prime minister. The college's 160th anniversary was commemorated in 2025.

Having been a school for boys aged 13 to 18 since its foundation, in 1992 it merged with Ellerslie Girls’ School and Hillstone preparatory school (independent primary school) to become coeducational and to offer education for pupils aged 3 to 18. The college also departed from the full boarding model of many English public schools by admitting day pupils, although over two-thirds of pupils board.

A development scheme was initiated in 2008. This included the building of a new sports complex, new athletics and viewing facilities at the pitches and two new boarding houses. The sports complex and new houses were opened in October 2009. Ellerslie House was opened for girls, commemorating the eponymous former girls' school, and the other new house has become the new permanent residence for the boys of No. 7.

In April 2010, part of the school suffered serious damage when a fire broke out in one of the boarding houses. The Grade II listed building, built in 1871, was home to 55 girls and the housemistress, although no one was in residence at the time of the fire. In 2024, the college submitted plans for the adaptation of the War Memorial Library to a Sixth form centre.

The original preparatory school, Hillstone, opened in 1883. When the college went coeducational, Hillstone was absorbed into Malvern to become its preparatory department. In 2008 this was merged with The Downs preparatory school in the nearby village of Colwall, Herefordshire to form The Downs, Malvern College Preparatory School. Boarding is available to pupils in the preparatory school aged 7 and above, who reside in a separate boarding house known as The Warren.

== Governance and admissions ==
=== College Council ===
The school is governed by a College Council of approximately 18 members, chaired by Jonathan Penrice. The Malvern College Corporation owns the College property, land and assets which are managed by the Council whose members are also the directors of the registered charity company.

=== College principals ===
Educationalist and former Cambridge University cricket player Antony Clark joined the school as headmaster in 2008. Clark was succeeded in 2019 by Keith Metcalfe.

=== Admissions and fees ===
Entry to the main school (Years 7 to 11, ages 11–16) is by a process of visits, interviews and assessments. Entry to the Lower School (Years 1 to 6, ages 5–11) and the Sixth form (Years 12 to 13, ages 16–18) follow a similar process. Busaries and scholarships are offered to support students for whom the school fees would otherwise be prohibitive. In addition to academic scholarships, subject scholarships as offered in art and design, drama, music and sport.

For 2025–2026, the annual fees for boarders are £59,295 and £40,245 for day pupils. As of 27 January 2025, 655 pupils aged between 13 and 19 were enrolled at the school.

== Curriculum ==
The college follows the English national curriculum and offers courses of study in a range of academic subjects, preparing pupils for General Certificate of Secondary Education (GCSE) at A-Level (Advanced level) and International Baccalaureate (IB) examinations. Additionally, the college offers a "super-curriculum", a pupil-directed course of elective studies. The additional curriculum was introduced by the headmaster, Keith Metcalfe on his appointment in 2019, and in 2025, it was the basis of his nomination and finalist for the 2025 annual national award for Headteacher of the Year (Independent) run by the awards of the TES magazine (formerly the Times Educational Supplement).

In 2011, the school was ranked joint 8th for the average grades of its IB pupils. In 2023, 28% of pupils scored A*-A for their A-Levels examination, whereas 60% scored A*-B. For IB, the 2024 cohort scored an average of 35 or more IB points against the global average of 30.32 points. In its ranking of independent schools by GCSE, results The Guardian placed it 148th.

A report on the college authored by the Independent Schools Inspectorate and issued in January 2025 found that all requirements for leadership, education, pupils' physical, emotional and mental well-being, social and economic education and safeguarding were met.

== Sports ==
The college offers sports such as football, cricket, rugby, rackets, fives, athletics, tennis, squash, croquet, basketball, netball, volleyball, badminton, golf, swimming and clay pigeon shooting. All sporting activities are available to girls and boys.

On 16 October 2009, a new sports complex and hospitality suite were opened by the then Duke of York (later Andrew Mountbatten-Windsor). The indoor complex, which was built on the site of the old sports hall and swimming pool, has an eight-court sports hall, a dance studio and fitness suite, a climbing wall, squash courts, a shooting range, a suite of rooms for social and academic functions, and a six-lane swimming pool. The facilities are also available for use by the wider community in Malvern, and are used by Worcestershire County Cricket Club for their winter training programme. In February 2010, the college hosted the England Blind Cricket squad for training sessions. The college holds an annual cross country race, the Ledbury Run or the "Ledder". Pupils from Years 11, 12 and 13 can take part in the eight-mile long run from the town of Ledbury to the college campus. While optional, most boarding houses encourage students to take part. Old Malvernians also participate.

== Buildings ==
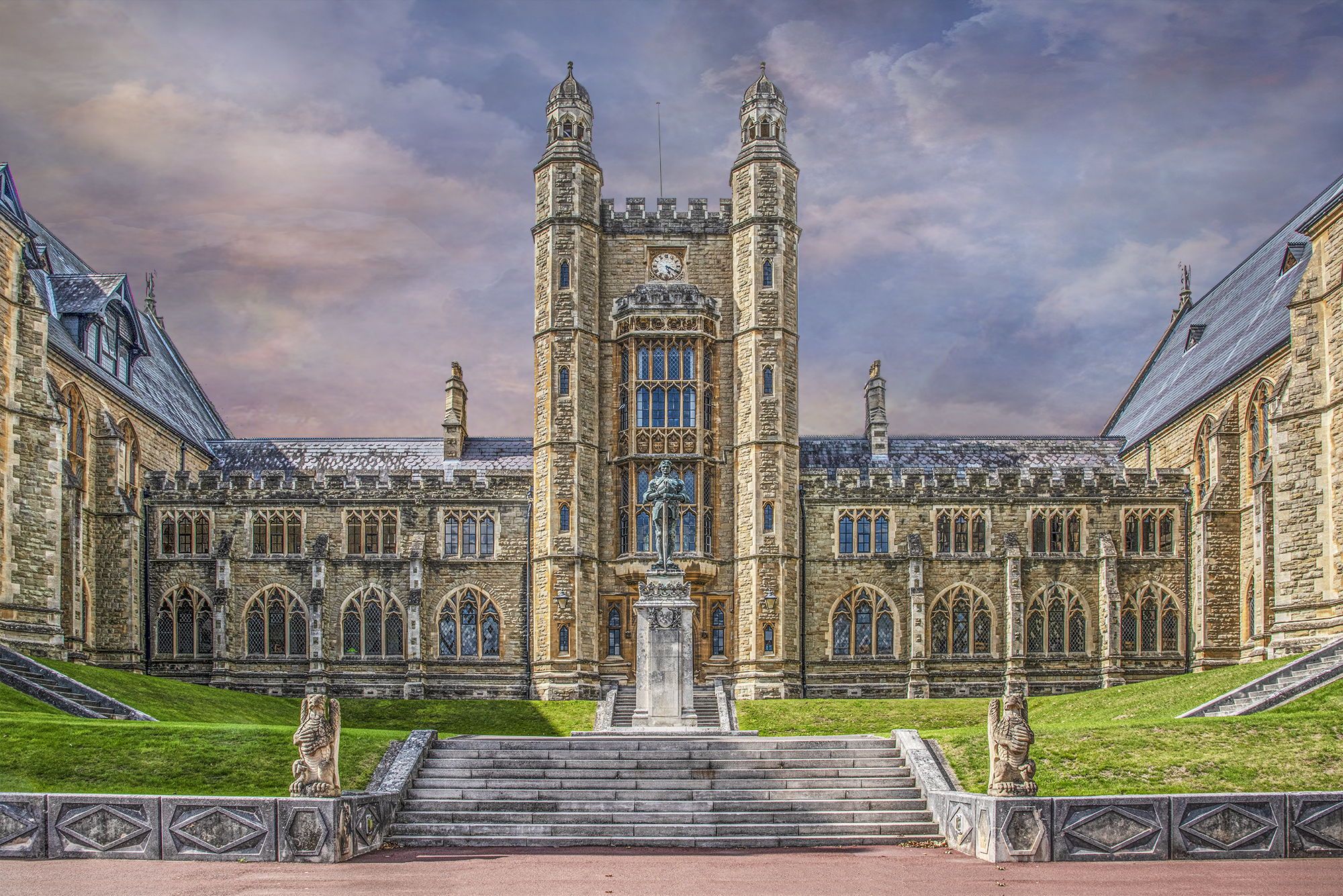
The Main Building gatehouse and the War Memorial

The school has occupied the same site covering some 250 acres (101 ha) near the town centre of Great Malvern on the lower slopes of the Malvern Hills since its foundation.

The Main Building of the college was designed by Charles Francis Hansom and built between 1863 and 1865. (Note: Charles Francis Hansom had previously made his reputation with his design for Clifton College.) It forms three sides of a quadrangle, with a central gatehouse for which Hansom drew inspiration from Lupton's Tower at Eton College. The building material is local stone and the style is Tudor Revival. The block is a Grade II* listed building: in the United Kingdom listed buildings are structures of particular architectural or historic interest deserving of special protection. They are classified under three categories, Grade I, the highest grade, Grade II* and Grade II. The Main Building is described by Pevsner as "large and impressive". Hansom's design was innovative for its time, although it followed his work at Clifton College. The Main Building was entirely given over to teaching and administration, with boarding pupils being accommodated in a series of houses, ultimately numbering nine, which circle the school campus.

The chapel to the south dates from 1897 and was the work of Sir Arthur Blomfield. The style is Perpendicular Gothic Revival. Pevsner described the exterior as "rather fussy". It contains a reredos by Blomfield's nephew, Reginald, and much Victorian stained glass by Charles Eamer Kempe and Clayton and Bell. The overall scheme for the glass was designed by M. R. James, an English medievalist scholar and provost of King's College, Cambridge. (Note: M. R. James is better known today as the author of ghost stories. He also designed the scheme of stained glass restoration at Malvern Priory.) In 1908, Blomfield's son, Charles undertook an extension.

The college has two memorials to its pupils killed in the First and Second World Wars; the War Memorial, including a statue of Saint George by Alfred Drury, which stands in the main quadrangle; and the War Memorial Library, built in 1924 to the designs of Sir Aston Webb. (Note: Historic England credits Sir Aston Webb with the library design, but Alan Brooks, in his Worcestershire volume in the Pevsner Buildings of England series suggests that Webb's son Maurice may have taken the leading role.) The library has a chimneypiece designed by Leonard Shuffrey. Other listed buildings on the campus include the School House; three of the college's boarding houses, Nos. 3, 4 and 6; and two sets of gates.

== Innovations ==
The college has a history of innovation in the field of education. In 1963, it was the first independent school to have a language laboratory. The Old Malvernian Society claims the college was the first in the country to have had a careers service. Under the direction of John Lewis, a former head of the science department, the school pioneered Nuffield physics in the 1960s, "Science in Society" in the 1970s, and the "Diploma of Achievement" in the 1990s. At the beginning of the 1990s, Malvern College became one of the first schools in Britain to offer the choice between the International Baccalaureate and A-Levels in the sixth form. The school was one of the first boys' public schools to become fully coeducational from the preparatory department to sixth form.

Each summer, the staff and some older pupils run a summer school, Young Malvern, which incorporates many sports, activities and learning experiences. Malvern College is one of the two schools in the country (the other being Dulwich College) to offer debating in the curriculum and pupils participate in regional and national competitions including the Debating Matters competition and the Three Counties Tournament. The subject is compulsory at the Foundation Year level.

== Overseas campuses ==
The college has five overseas campuses under the governance of Malvern College International; a previous Swiss campus was closed in 2023:

- Malvern College Qingdao and Malvern College Chengdu, both in mainland China, which follow the National Curriculum of the Chinese Communist Party (CCP).
- Malvern College Hong Kong
- Malvern College Tokyo
- Malvern College Egypt

== Alumni ==
The school's alumni ("old boys") are known as Old Malvernians, or OMs. The Malvernian Society holds many annual reunions and events. Old Malvernians, including former pupils of schools which have merged with Malvern College, benefit from a reduction in fees for their own children. (Note: A similar fees remission scheme for the children of teachers at the college became the subject of legal challenge, leading to a landmark decision of the House of Lords in 1992, Pepper (Inspector of Taxes) v Hart.) A freemasonic lodge for alumni of the school, Old Malvernian Lodge No. 4363, was founded by Old Malvernian Major Richard Charles Lowndes.

Other Old Malvernian clubs and societies exist for court games, golf, sailing, shooting, the Old Malvernians Cricket Club, and the Old Malvernians Football Club, a club competing in the Arthurian League.

College alumni have gained recognition in such fields as the military, politics, business, science, culture and sport - especially first-class cricket and the eighteen county cricket clubs. Among the most famous Old Malvernians are the spymaster James Jesus Angleton, former head of the CIA's counter-intelligence; Aleister Crowley, the controversial but influential occultist; the historian Sir John Wheeler-Bennett; the actor Denholm Elliott, Reginald 'Tip' Foster, the only man to have captained England at both cricket and football; the Olympic gold medalist and highly-decorated war veteran Brigadier General Arnold Jackson, and the novelist C. S. Lewis, author of The Chronicles of Narnia. (Note: C.S. Lewis, in his partial autobiography Surprised by Joy, described his experiences at Malvern, disguising it as Wyvern College.) Other well-known personalities include the businessman Lord MacLaurin, a former chairman of Tesco and Vodafone; Jeremy Paxman, journalist, author, and BBC presenter of Newsnight and University Challenge; Lord Weatherill, a former Speaker of the House of Commons, and Sir Chris Whitty, Chief Medical Officer for England and Chief Medical Adviser to the UK Government at the time of the COVID-19 pandemic.

Old Malvernians who have become heads of state or government include the eponymously titled Godfrey Huggins, 1st Viscount Malvern, who served as Prime Minister of Southern Rhodesia and of the Federation of Rhodesia and Nyasaland; and Najib Razak, the sixth prime minister of Malaysia. The former was the British Commonwealth's longest-serving prime minister by the time he left office.

Military figures educated at the college include two posthumous holders of the Victoria Cross, Captain David Younger who received the award following his death in the Second Boer War, and Major Kenneth Muir, who received his award following his death in the Korean War; the First Sea Lord Admiral of the Fleet Sir Varyl Begg; Air Marshall Sir Denis Crowley-Milling; and General Sir Charles Harington, Deputy Chief of the Imperial General Staff.

Old Malvernian Nobel Prize winners include Francis William Aston, winner of the 1922 Nobel Prize in Chemistry, James Meade, winner of the Nobel Prize in Economics in 1977, and Frederick Sanger, who is one of only three people to have won multiple Nobel Prizes in the same category (Nobel Prize in Chemistry), and one of five persons with two Nobel Prizes.

Old Malvernians have been instrumental in the formation of charitable and sporting organisations, such as the Docklands Settlements, supporting families in London's East End, and Blackburn Rovers F.C., a six-times winner of the Football Association Cup.

== See also ==
List of teachers of Malvern College

- The Southern Railway named each of its 40 V Class locomotives after English public schools. The nameplate for the "Malvern" locomotive (no. 929) is displayed in the school's Memorial Library.
