= Texas hold 'em =

Variation of the card game of poker

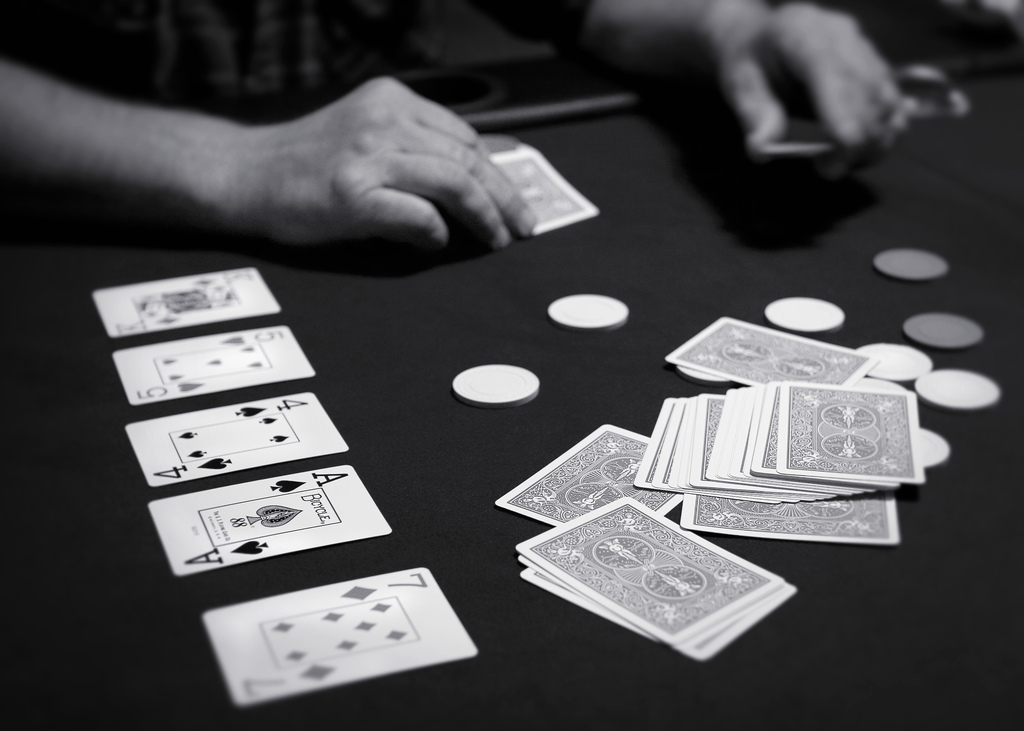
- Texas hold 'em involves community cards available to all players.
- Alternative names: Hold 'em
- Type: Community card poker
- Players: 2+, usually 2–10, theoretically up to 22
- Skills: Probability, psychology, game theory, strategy
- Cards: 52
- Deck: French
- Rank (high→low): A K Q J 10 9 8 7 6 5 4 3 2 (A when used in a Straight)
- Play: Clockwise
- Chance: Medium

Texas hold 'em (also known as Texas holdem, hold 'em, and holdem) is a popular variant of the card game of poker. Two cards, known as hole cards, are dealt face down to each player, and then five community cards are dealt face up in three stages. The stages consist of a series of three cards ("the flop" or "third street"), later an additional single card ("the turn" or "fourth street"), and a final card ("the river" or "fifth street"). Each player seeks the best five-card poker hand from any combination of the seven cards: the five community cards and their two hole cards. Players have betting options to check, call, raise, or fold. Rounds of betting take place before the flop is dealt and after each subsequent deal. The player who has the best hand and has not folded by the end of all betting rounds wins all the money bet for the hand, known as the pot. In certain situations, a "split pot" or "tie" can occur when two players have hands of equivalent value. This is also called "chop the pot". Texas hold 'em is also the H game featured in HORSE and HOSE.

== Objective ==
In Texas hold 'em, as in all variants of poker, individuals compete for an amount of money or chips contributed by the players themselves (called the pot). Because the cards are dealt randomly and outside the control of the players, each player attempts to control the amount of money in the pot based on the hand they are holding, and on their prediction as to what their opponents may be holding and how they might behave.

The game is divided into a series of hands (deals); at the conclusion of each hand, the pot is typically awarded to one player (an exception in which the pot is divided between two or more is discussed below). A hand may end at the showdown, in which case the remaining players compare their hands and the highest hand is awarded the pot; that highest hand is usually held by only one player, but can be held by more in the case of a tie. The other possibility for the conclusion of a hand occurs when all but one player has folded and have thereby abandoned any claim to the pot, in which case the pot is awarded to the player who has not folded.

The objective of winning players is not to win every individual hand, but rather to win over the longer term by making mathematically and psychologically better decisions regarding when and how much to bet, raise, call or fold. Winning poker players work to enhance their opponents' betting and maximize their own expected gain on each round of betting, to thereby increase their long-term winnings.

== History ==
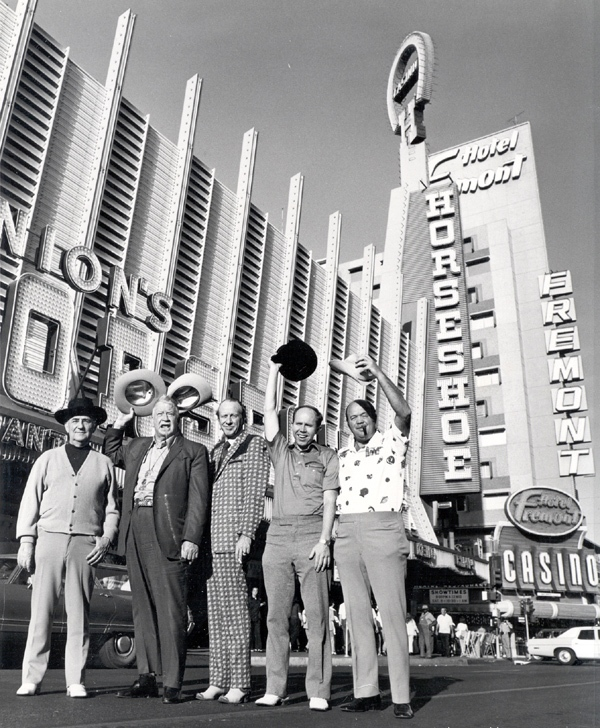
Johnny Moss, Chill Wills, Amarillo Slim, Jack Binion, and Puggy Pearson outside Binion's Horseshoe in Las Vegas in 1974

Although little is known about the invention of Texas hold 'em, the Texas Legislature officially recognizes Robstown, Texas, as the game's birthplace, dating it to the early 20th century.

After the game spread throughout Texas, hold 'em was introduced to Las Vegas in 1963 at the California Club by Corky McCorquodale. The game became popular and quickly spread to the Golden Nugget, Stardust and Dunes. In 1967, a group of Texan gamblers and card players, including Crandell Addington, Doyle Brunson, and Amarillo Slim were playing in Las Vegas. This is when "ace high" was changed from the original form in which aces were low. Addington said the first time he saw the game was in 1959. "They didn't call it Texas hold 'em at the time, they just called it hold 'em.… I thought then that if it were to catch on, it would become the game. Draw poker, you bet only twice; hold 'em, you bet four times. That meant you could play strategically. This was more of a thinking man's game."

For several years the Golden Nugget Casino in Downtown Las Vegas was the only casino in Las Vegas to offer the game. At that time, the Golden Nugget's poker room was "truly a 'sawdust joint,' with…oiled sawdust covering the floors." Because of its location and decor, this poker room did not receive many rich drop-in clients, and as a result, professional players sought a more prominent location. In 1969, the Las Vegas professionals were invited to play Texas hold 'em at the entrance of the now-demolished Dunes Casino on the Las Vegas Strip. This prominent location, and the relative inexperience of poker players with Texas hold 'em, resulted in a very remunerative game for professional players.

After a failed attempt to establish a "Gambling Fraternity Convention", Tom Moore added the first ever poker tournament to the Second Annual Gambling Fraternity Convention held in 1969. This tournament featured several games, including Texas hold 'em. In 1970, Benny and Jack Binion acquired the rights to this convention, renamed it the World Series of Poker, and moved it to their casino, Binion's Horseshoe, in Las Vegas. After its first year, a journalist, Tom Thackrey, suggested that the main event of this tournament should be no-limit Texas hold 'em. The Binions agreed and ever since no-limit Texas hold 'em has been played as the main event. Interest in the main event continued to grow steadily over the next two decades. After receiving only eight entrants in 1972, the numbers grew to over one hundred entrants in 1982, and over two hundred in 1991.

During this time, B & G Publishing Co., Inc. published Doyle Brunson's revolutionary poker strategy guide, Super/System. Despite being self-published and priced at $100 in 1978, the book revolutionized the way poker was played. It was one of the first books to discuss Texas hold 'em, and is today cited as one of the most important books on this game. In 1983, Al Alvarez published The Biggest Game in Town, a book detailing a 1981 World Series of Poker event. The first book of its kind, it described the world of professional poker players and the World Series of Poker. Alvarez's book is credited with beginning the genre of poker literature and with bringing Texas hold 'em (and poker generally) to a wider audience. Alvarez's book was not the first book about poker. The Education of a Poker Player, by Herbert Yardley, a former U.S. government code breaker, was published in 1957.

Interest in hold 'em outside of Nevada began to grow in the 1980s as well. Although California had legal card rooms offering draw poker, Texas hold 'em was deemed to be prohibited under a statute that made illegal the (now unheard of) game "stud-horse". But in 1988 Texas hold 'em was declared legally distinct from stud-horse in Tibbetts v. Van De Kamp, and declared to be a game of skill. Almost immediately card rooms across the state offered Texas hold 'em. It is often presumed that this decision ruled that hold 'em was a game of skill, but the distinction between skill and chance has never entered into California jurisprudence regarding poker.

After a trip to Las Vegas, bookmakers Terry Rogers and Liam Flood introduced the game to European card players in the early 1980s.

== Popularity ==
Texas hold 'em's popularity surged in the 2000s due to exposure on television, the Internet and popular literature. During this time, hold 'em replaced seven-card stud as the most common game in U.S. casinos. The no-limit betting form is used in the widely televised main event of the World Series of Poker (WSOP) and the World Poker Tour (WPT).

Hold 'em's simplicity and popularity have inspired a wide variety of strategy books that provide recommendations for proper play. Most of these books recommend a strategy that involves playing relatively few hands but betting and raising often with the hands one plays. In the first decade of the twenty-first century, Texas hold 'em experienced a surge in popularity worldwide. Many observers attribute this growth to the synergy of five factors: the invention of online poker, the game's appearance in film and on television, invention, and usage of the "hole card cam" (which allowed viewers to see hole cards played in the hand as a means of determining strategy and decision-making during gameplay), the appearance of television commercials advertising online cardrooms, and the 2003 World Series of Poker championship victory by online qualifier Chris Moneymaker.

=== Television and film ===
Prior to poker becoming widely televised, the movie Rounders (1998), starring Matt Damon and Edward Norton, gave moviegoers a romantic view of the game as a way of life despite the poker portrayed being often criticized by more serious players. Texas hold 'em was the main game played during the movie and the no-limit variety was described, following Doyle Brunson, as the "Cadillac of Poker". A clip of the classic showdown between Johnny Chan and Erik Seidel from the 1988 World Series of Poker was also incorporated into the film. More recently, a high-stakes Texas hold 'em game was central to the plot of the 2006 James Bond film Casino Royale, in place of baccarat, the casino game central to the novel of the same name on which the film was based. In 2008, an acclaimed short film called Shark Out of Water was released on DVD. This film is unique in that it deals with the darker, more addictive elements of the game, and features Phil Hellmuth and Brad Booth.

Hold 'em tournaments had been televised since the late 1970s, but they did not become popular until 1999, when hidden lipstick cameras were first used to show players' private hole cards on the Late Night Poker TV show in the United Kingdom. Hold 'em exploded in popularity as a spectator sport in the United States and Canada in early 2003, when the World Poker Tour adopted the lipstick cameras idea. A few months later, ESPN's coverage of the 2003 World Series of Poker featured the unexpected victory of Internet player Chris Moneymaker, an amateur player who gained admission to the tournament by winning a series of online tournaments. Moneymaker's victory initiated a sudden surge of interest in the series (along with internet poker), based on the egalitarian idea that anyone—even a rank novice—could become a world champion.

In 2003, there were 839 entrants in the WSOP main event, and triple that number in 2004. The crowning of the 2004 WSOP champion, Greg "Fossilman" Raymer, a patent attorney from Connecticut, further fueled the popularity of the event among amateur (and particularly Internet) players. In the 2005 main event, an unprecedented 5,619 entrants vied for a first prize of $7,500,000. The winner, Joe Hachem of Australia, was a semi-professional player. This growth continued in 2006, with 8,773 entrants and a first place prize of $12,000,000 (won by Jamie Gold).

Beyond the series, other television shows—including the long-running World Poker Tour—are credited with increasing the popularity of Texas hold 'em. In addition to its presence on network and general audience cable television, poker has now become a regular part of sports networks' programming in the United States.

=== Literature ===
The English journalist and biographer Anthony Holden spent a year on the professional poker circuit from 1988 to 1989 and wrote about his experiences in Big Deal: A Year as a Professional Poker Player. The follow-up book, Bigger Deal: A Year Inside the Poker Boom covers the period 2005–2006 and describes a poker world "changed beyond recognition".

Twenty years after the publication of Alvarez's groundbreaking book, James McManus published a semi-autobiographical book, Positively Fifth Street (2003), which simultaneously describes the trial surrounding the murder of Ted Binion and McManus's own entry into the 2000 World Series of Poker. McManus, a poker amateur, finished fifth in the no-limit Texas hold 'em main event, winning over $200,000. In the book McManus discusses events surrounding the series, the trial of Sandy Murphy and Rick Tabish, poker strategy, and some history of poker and the world series.

Michael Craig's 2005 book The Professor, the Banker, and the Suicide King details a series of high-stakes Texas hold 'em one-on-one games between Texas banker Andy Beal and a rotating group of poker professionals. As of 2006, these games were the highest stakes ever played, reaching $100,000–$200,000 fixed limit.

=== Online poker ===
Poker revenues from Party Gaming (2002–2006). The drop off in 2006 is due to the UIGEA.

The ability to play cheaply and anonymously online has been credited as a cause of the increase in popularity of Texas hold 'em. Online poker sites both allow people to try out games (in some cases the games are entirely free to play and are just for fun social experiences) and also provide an avenue for entry into large tournaments (like the World Series of Poker) via smaller tournaments known as satellites. The 2003 and 2004 winners (Chris Moneymaker and Greg Raymer, respectively) of the World Series no-limit hold 'em main event qualified by playing in these tournaments.

Although online poker grew from its inception in 1998 until 2003, Moneymaker's win and the appearance of television advertisements in 2003 contributed to a tripling of industry revenues in 2004.

== Rules ==
=== Betting structures ===
A standard hold 'em game showing the position of the blinds relative to the dealer button

Hold 'em is normally played using small and big blind bets—forced bets by two players. Antes (forced contributions by all players) may be used in addition to blinds, particularly in later stages of tournament play. A dealer button is used to represent the player in the dealer position; the dealer button rotates clockwise after each hand, changing the position of the dealer and blinds. The small blind is posted by the player to the left of the dealer and is usually equal to half of the big blind. The big blind, posted by the player to the left of the small blind, is equal to the minimum bet. In tournament poker, the blind/ante structure periodically increases as the tournament progresses. After one round of betting is done, the next betting round will start with the person in the small blind.

When only two players remain, special "head-to-head" or "heads up" rules are enforced and the blinds are posted differently. In this case, the person with the dealer button posts the small blind, while their opponent places the big blind. The dealer acts first before the flop. After the flop, the dealer acts last and continues to do so for the remainder of the hand.

The three most common variations of hold 'em are limit hold 'em, no-limit hold 'em and pot-limit hold 'em. Limit hold 'em has historically been the most popular form of hold 'em found in casino live action games in the United States. In limit hold 'em, bets and raises during the first two rounds of betting (pre-flop and flop) must be equal to the big blind; this amount is called the small bet. In the next two rounds of betting (turn and river), bets and raises must be equal to twice the big blind; this amount is called the big bet.

No-limit hold 'em has grown in popularity and is the form most commonly found in televised tournament poker and is the game played in the main event of the World Series of Poker. In no-limit hold 'em, players may bet or raise any amount over the minimum raise up to all of the chips the player has at the table (called an all-in bet). The minimum raise is equal to the size of the previous bet or raise. If someone wishes to re-raise, they must raise at least the amount of the previous raise. For example, if the big blind is $2 and there is a raise of $6 to a total of $8, a re-raise must be at least $6 more for a total of $14. If a raise or re-raise is all-in and does not equal the size of the previous raise (or half the size in some casinos), the initial raiser cannot re-raise again (in case there are other players also still in the game). In pot-limit hold 'em, the maximum raise is the current size of the pot (including the amount needed to call).

Some casinos that offer hold 'em also allow the player to the left of the big blind to post an optional live straddle, usually double the amount of the big blind. This causes that player to act as the big blind and the player has an option to raise when it comes to their turn again. (Some variations allow for straddle on the button). No-limit games may also allow multiple re-straddles, in any amount that would be a legal raise.

=== Play of the hand ===
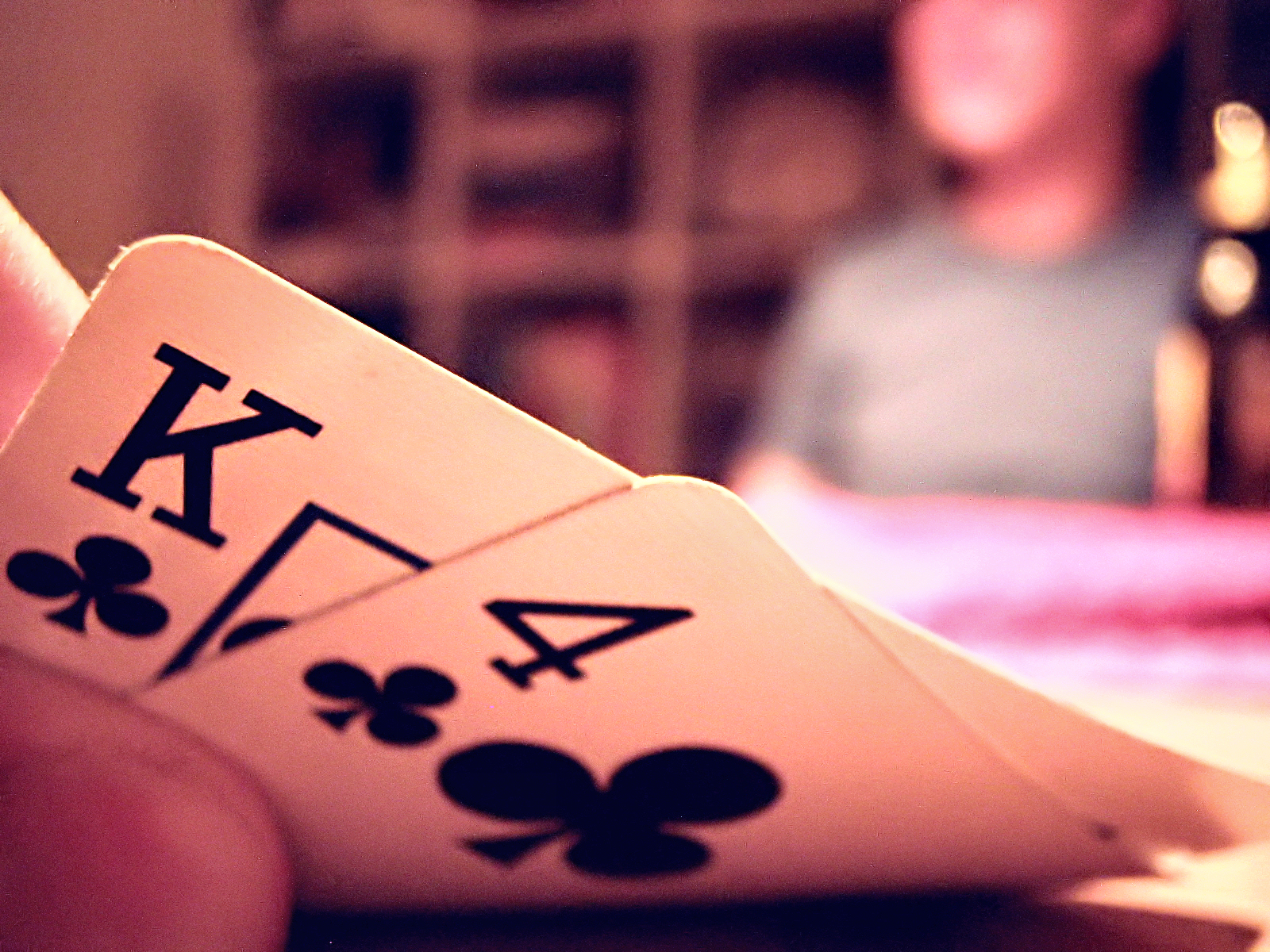
Each player is dealt two private cards in hold 'em, which are dealt first.

This video shows how to deal a hand for Texas hold 'em and some of the types of hands needed in order to win.

Following a shuffle of the cards, play begins with each player being dealt two cards face down, with the player in the small blind receiving the first card and the player in the button set receiving the last card dealt. (As in most poker games, the deck is a standard 52-card deck containing no jokers.) These cards are the players' hole or pocket cards. These are the only cards each player will receive individually, and they will (possibly) be revealed only at the showdown, making Texas hold 'em a closed poker game.

The hand begins with a "pre-flop" betting round, beginning with the player to the left of the big blind (or the player to the left of the dealer, if no blinds are used) and continuing clockwise. A round of betting continues until every player has folded, put in all of their chips, or matched the amount put in by all other active players. See betting for a detailed account. Note that the blinds are considered "live" in the pre-flop betting round, meaning that they are counted toward the amount that the blind player must contribute. If all players call around to the player in the big blind position, that player may either check or raise.

After the pre-flop betting round, assuming there remain at least two players taking part in the hand, the dealer deals a flop: three face-up community cards. The flop is followed by a second betting round. This and all subsequent betting rounds begin with the player to the dealer's left and continue clockwise.

After the flop betting round ends, a single community card (called the turn or fourth street) is dealt, followed by a third betting round. A final single community card (called the river or fifth street) is then dealt, followed by a fourth betting round and the showdown, if necessary.

In all casinos, the dealer will burn a card before the flop, turn, and river. Because of this burn, players who are betting cannot see the back of the next community card to come. This is done for traditional reasons, to avoid any possibility of a player knowing in advance the next card to be dealt due to its being marked.

=== The showdown ===
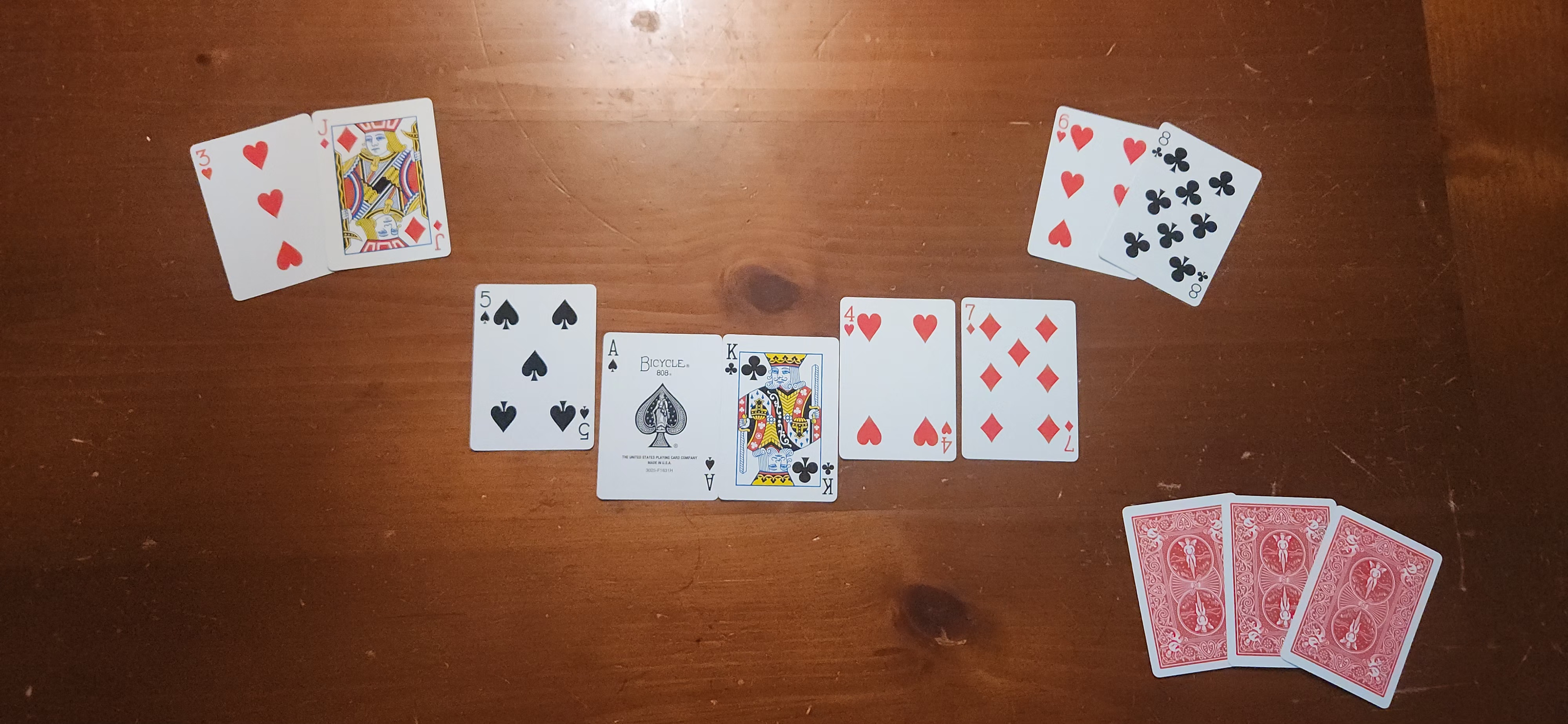
A heads-up game of hold 'em at showdown. The player with 68-offsuit wins by achieving a straight, from 4 to 8, versus a Jack-high. The three burn cards are displayed at the bottom right.

If a player bets and all other players fold, then the remaining player is awarded the pot and is not required to show their hole cards. If two or more players remain after the final betting round, a showdown occurs. On the showdown, each player plays the best poker hand they can make from the seven cards comprising their two hole cards and the five community cards. A player may use both of their own two hole cards, only one, or none at all, to form their final five-card hand. If the five community cards form the player's best hand, then the player is said to be playing the board and can only hope to split the pot because each other player can also use the same five cards to construct the same hand.

If the best hand is shared by more than one player, then the pot is split equally among them, with any extra chips going to the first players after the button in clockwise order. It is common for players to have closely valued, but not identically ranked hands. Nevertheless, one must be careful in determining the best hand; if the hand involves fewer than five cards (such as two pair or three of a kind), then kickers are used to settle ties (see the second example below). The card's numerical rank is of sole importance; suit values are irrelevant in hold 'em.

=== Hand values ===
The following table shows the possible hand values in increasing order.

Name	Description	Example
High card	Simple value of the card. Lowest: 2 – Highest: Ace (King in the example)	10 of clubs 4 of hearts 7 of diamonds King of clubs 2 of spades
Pair	Two cards with the same value	King of clubs King of hearts 7 of diamonds 2 of clubs 5 of spades
Two pairs	Two times two cards with the same value	King of clubs King of hearts 7 of diamonds 7 of clubs 5 of spades
Three of a kind	Three cards with the same value	King of clubs King of hearts King of diamonds 7 of clubs 5 of spades
Straight	Sequence of 5 cards in increasing value (Ace can precede 2 or follow up King, but not both), not of the same suit	3 of clubs 4 of hearts 5 of diamonds 6 of clubs 7 of spades
Flush	5 cards of the same suit, not in sequential order	King of clubs Queen of clubs 9 of clubs 8 of clubs 2 of clubs
Full house	Combination of three of a kind and a pair	King of clubs King of hearts King of diamonds 7 of clubs 7 of spades
Four of a kind	Four cards of the same value	6 of spades 6 of diamonds 6 of hearts 6 of clubs King of spades
Straight flush	Straight of the same suit	2 of spades 3 of spades 4 of spades 5 of spades 6 of spades
Royal flush	Highest straight of the same suit	10 of hearts Jack of hearts Queen of hearts King of hearts Ace of hearts

=== Misdeal ===
If the first or second card dealt is exposed, then this is considered a misdeal. The dealer then retrieves the card, reshuffles the deck, and again cuts the cards. However, if any other hole card is exposed due to a dealer error, the deal continues as usual. After completing the deal, the dealer replaces the exposed card with the top card on the deck, and the exposed card is then used as the burn card. If more than one hole card is exposed, a misdeal is declared by the dealer and the hand is dealt again from the beginning. A misdeal is also declared if a player receives more than two hole cards by mistake (e.g. two cards stuck together).

== Examples ==
=== Sample showdown ===
Here is a sample showdown:

Board
Bob	Carol	Ted	Alice

Each player plays the best five-card hand they can make with the seven cards available. Below is the list of best hands each player has.

Bob	4 of clubs 4 of hearts 4 of diamonds Ace of clubs King of spades	Three of a kind: fours
Carol	Ace of spades King of spades 9 of spades 8 of spades 7 of spades	Flush: Ace high
Ted	King of spades King of hearts King of diamonds 4 of clubs 4 of hearts	Full house: Kings full of fours
Alice	8 of spades 7 of spades 6 of diamonds 5 of diamonds 4 of hearts	Straight: Four to eight

In this case, Ted wins as he has the best hand (full house). If arranged in order of hand strength from the strongest, it would be Ted's full house, Carol's flush, Alice's straight, and Bob's three of a kind.

=== Sample hand ===
The blinds for this example hand

Here is a sample game involving four players. The players' individual hands will not be revealed until the showdown, to give a better sense of what happens during play:

Compulsory bets: Alice is the dealer. Bob, to Alice's left, posts a small blind of $1, and Carol posts a big blind of $2.

Pre-flop: Alice deals two hole cards face down to each player, beginning with Bob and ending with herself. Ted must act first, being the first player left to the big blind. Ted cannot check because the $2 big blind plays as a bet, and so folds. Alice calls the $2. Bob adds an additional $1 to the $1 small blind to call the $2 total. Carol's blind is "live" (see blind), so there is the option to raise here, but Carol checks instead, ending the first betting round. The pot now contains $6, $2 from each of three players.

Flop: Alice now burns a card and deals the flop of three face-up community cards, 9♣ K♣ 3♥. On this round, as on all subsequent rounds, the player on the dealer's left begins the betting. Bob checks, Carol opens for $2, and Alice raises another $2 (puts in $4, $2 to match Carol and $2 to raise), making the total bet now facing Bob $4. Bob calls (puts in $4, $2 to match Carol's initial bet and $2 to match Alice's raise). Carol calls as well, putting in $2. The pot now contains $18, $6 from the last round and $12 from three players this round.

Turn: Alice now burns another card and deals the turn card face up. It is the 5♠. Bob checks, Carol checks, and Alice checks; the turn has been checked around. The pot still contains $18.

River: Alice burns another card and deals the final river card, the 9♦, making the final board 9♣ K♣ 3♥ 5♠ 9♦. Bob bets $4, Carol calls, and Alice folds (Alice's holding was A♣ 7♣ and was hoping the river card would be a club to make a flush).

Showdown: Bob shows his hand of Q♠ 9♥, so the best five-card hand possible is 9♣ 9♦ 9♥ K♣ Q♠, for three nines, with a king-queen kicker. Carol shows her cards of K♠ J♥, making a final hand K♣ K♠ 9♣ 9♦ J♥ for two pair, kings and nines, with a jack kicker. Bob wins the showdown and the $26 pot.

=== Kickers and ties ===
Because of the presence of community cards in Texas hold 'em, different players' hands can often run very close in value. As a result, it is common for kickers to be used to determine the winning hand and also for two hands (or maybe more) to tie. A kicker is a card that is part of the five-card poker hand, but is not used in determining a hand's rank. For instance, in the hand A-A-A-K-Q, the king and queen are kickers.

The following situation illustrates the importance of breaking ties with kickers and card ranks, as well as the use of the five-card rule. After the turn, the board and players' hole cards are as follows.

Board (after the turn)
Bob	Carol

At the moment, Bob is in the lead with a hand of Q♠ Q♣ 8♠ 8♥ K♥, making two pair, queens and eights, with a king kicker. This beats Carol's hand of Q♥ Q♣ 8♠ 8♥ 10♦ by virtue of the king kicker.

Suppose the final card is the A♠, making the final board 8♠ Q♣ 8♥ 4♣ A♠. Bob and Carol still each have two pair (queens and eights), but both of them are now entitled to play the final ace as their fifth card, making their hands both two pair, queens and eights, with an ace kicker. Bob's king no longer plays because the ace on the board plays as the fifth card in both hands, and a hand is only composed of the best five cards. They therefore tie and split the pot. However, if the last card is a jack or lower (except an eight, which would make a full house, or a ten, which would give Carol a higher second pair), Bob's king stays in the game and Bob wins.

== Strategy ==
Most poker authors recommend a tight-aggressive approach to playing Texas hold 'em. This strategy involves playing relatively few hands (tight), but betting and raising often with those that one does play (aggressive). Although this strategy is often recommended, some professional players successfully employ other strategies as well.

Almost all authors agree that where a player sits in the order of play (known as position) is an important element of Texas hold 'em strategy, particularly in no-limit hold'em. Players who act later have more information than players who act earlier. As a result, players typically play fewer hands from early positions than later positions.

Because of the game's level of complexity, it has received some attention from academics. One attempt to develop a quantitative model of a Texas hold'em tournament as an isolated complex system has had some success, although the full consequences for optimal strategies remain to be explored. In addition, groups at the University of Alberta and Carnegie Mellon University worked to develop poker playing programs utilizing techniques in game theory and artificial intelligence. In January 2015, the AAAS journal Science reported that the group at the University of Alberta had succeeded in coding a computer program called Cepheus that can learn from its playing experience to optimize its CFR algorithm and approach playing perfection when opposing strong players in the variant known as heads-up limit Texas Hold 'em, which involves only two players. Although it does not win every hand, it is unbeatable on average over a large number of hands. The program exhibits more variation in its tactics than professional players do, for instance bluffing with weak hands that professional players tend to fold. Public web access to observe and play against Cepheus is available.

=== Starting hands ===
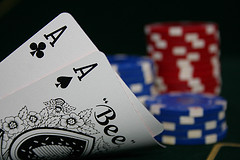
A pair of aces is statistically the best hand to be dealt in Texas hold 'em poker.

Because only two cards are dealt to each player, it is easy to characterize all of the starting hands. There are (52 × 51)/2 = 1,326 distinct possible combinations of two cards from a standard 52-card deck. Because no suit is more powerful than another, many of these can be equated for the analysis of starting-hand strategy. For example, although J♥ J♣ and J♦ J♠ are distinct combinations of cards by rank and suit, they are of equal value as starting hands.

Because of this equivalence, there are only 169 effectively different hole-card combinations. Thirteen of these are pairs, from deuces (twos) to aces. There are 78 ways to have two cards of different rank (12 possible hands containing one ace, 11 possible hands containing one king but no ace, 10 possible hands containing one queen but no ace or king, etc.). Both hole cards can be used in a flush if they are suited, but pairs are never suited, so there would be 13 possible pairs, 78 possible suited non-pairs, and 78 possible unsuited ("off-suit") non-pairs, for a total of 169 possible hands. Suited starting hands are stronger than their unsuited counterparts, although the magnitude of this strength advantage in different games is debated.

Because of the limited number of starting hands, most strategy guides include a detailed discussion of each of them. This distinguishes hold 'em from other poker games where the number of starting card combinations forces strategy guides to group hands into broad categories. Another result of this small number is the proliferation of colloquial names for individual hands.

=== Strategic differences in betting structures ===
Texas Hold'em is commonly played both as a "cash" or "ring" game and as a tournament game. Strategy for these different forms can vary.

==== Cash games ====
Before the advent of poker tournaments, all poker games were played with real money where players bet actual currency (or chips that represented currency). Games that feature wagering actual money on individual hands are still very common and are referred to as "cash games" or "ring games".

The no-limit and fixed-limit cash-game versions of hold 'em are strategically very different. Doyle Brunson claims that "the games are so different that there are not many players who rank with the best in both types of hold 'em. Many no-limit players have difficulty gearing down for limit, while limit players often lack the courage and 'feel' necessary to excel at no-limit." Because the size of bets is restricted in limit games, the ability to bluff is somewhat curtailed. Because one is not (usually) risking all of one's chips in limit poker, players are sometimes advised to take more chances.

Lower-stakes games also exhibit different properties than higher-stakes games. Small-stakes games often involve more players in each hand and can vary from extremely passive (little raising and betting) to extremely aggressive (many raises). This difference of small-stakes games has prompted several books dedicated to only those games.

==== Tournaments ====
Texas hold 'em is often associated with poker tournaments largely because it is played as the main event in many of the famous tournaments, including the World Series of Poker's Main Event, and is the most common tournament overall. Traditionally, a poker tournament is played with chips that represent a player's stake in the tournament. Standard play allows all entrants to "buy-in" for a fixed amount and all players begin with an equal value of chips. Play proceeds until one player has accumulated all the chips in play or a deal is made among the remaining players to "chop" the remaining prize pool. The money pool is redistributed to the players in relation to the place they finished in the tournament. Only a small percentage of the players receive any money, with the majority receiving nothing. "The percentages are not standardized, but common rules of thumb call for one table" (usually nine players) "to get paid for each 100 entrants," according to poker author Andrew Glazer, in his book, The Complete Idiot's Guide to Poker. A good rule of thumb is that close to 10% of players will be paid in a tournament. As a result, the strategy in poker tournaments can be very different from a cash game.

Proper strategy in tournaments can vary widely depending on the number of chips one has, the stage of the tournament, the number of chips others have, and the playing styles of one's opponents. Although some authors still recommend a tight playing style, others recommend looser play (playing more hands) in tournaments than one would otherwise play in cash games. In tournaments the blinds and antes increase regularly, and can become much larger near the end of the tournament. This can force players to play hands that they would not normally play when the blinds were small, which can warrant both more loose and more aggressive play.

==== Evaluating a hand ====
One of the most important things in Texas hold'em is knowing how to evaluate a hand. The strategy of playing each hand can be very different according to the strength of the hand. For example, on a strong hand, a player might want to try to appear weak in order to not scare off other players with weaker hands, while on a weak hand, a player might try to bluff other players into folding.

There are several ways to evaluate hand strength; two of the most common are counting outs and using calculators.

===== Counting outs =====
This method consists of counting the cards still in the deck, which in combination with the cards the player already has can give the player a potentially winning hand. Such cards are called "outs", and hand strength can be measured by how many outs are still in the deck (if there are many outs then the probability to get one of them is high and therefore the hand is strong). The following chart determines the probability of hitting outs (bettering the player's hand) based on how many cards are left in the deck and the draw type.

Outs	One Card %	Two Card %	One Card Odds	Two Card Odds	Draw Type
1	2%	4%	46	23	Inside Straight Flush
2	4%	8%	22	12	Pocket Pair to Set
3	7%	13%	14	7	One Overcard
4	9%	17%	10	5	Inside Straight / Two Pair to Full House
5	11%	20%	8	4	One Pair to Two Pair or Trips
6	13%	24%	6.7	3.2	No Pair to Pair / Two Overcards
7	15%	28%	5.6	2.6	Inside Straight & One Overcard
8	17%	32%	4.7	2.2	Open Straight
9	19%	35%	4.1	1.9	Flush
10	22%	38%	3.6	1.6	Inside Straight & Two Overcards
11	24%	42%	3.2	1.4	Open Straight & One Overcard
12	26%	45%	2.8	1.2	Flush & Inside Straight / Flush & One Overcard
13	28%	48%	2.5	1.1	
14	30%	51%	2.3	0.95	Open Straight & Two Overcards
15	33%	54%	2.1	0.85	Flush & Two Overcards / Flush & Open Ended Straight / Flush & Inside Straight & One Overcard
16	34%	57%	1.9	0.75	
17	37%	60%	1.7	0.66	

Multiplying the number of outs by two or four (the Two Times Rule or Four Times Rule) gives a reasonable approximation to the One Card % or Two Card %, respectively, in the above table. For example, an open straight draw on the flop has 8 outs so the odds to hit the straight on the turn is 16% (8 x 2) and the odds on the river is 32% (8 x 4).

===== Calculators =====
Calculators are poker tools that calculate the odds of a hand (combined with the cards on the table if there are any) to win the game. Calculators provide precise odds but they cannot be used in live games and are therefore mostly used on Internet poker games. The first known commercial poker calculator was marketed by Mike Caro. Michael Shackleford, the Wizard of Odds, later made one available to the public free of charge on his website.

== Similar games ==
There are several other poker variants that resemble Texas hold 'em. Hold 'em is a member of a class of poker games known as community card games, where some cards are available for use by all the players. There are several other games that use five community cards in addition to some private cards and are thus like Texas hold 'em. Royal hold 'em has the same structure as Texas hold 'em, but the deck contains only Aces, Kings, Queens, Jacks, and Tens. Pineapple and Omaha hold 'em both vary the number of cards an individual receives before the flop (along with the rules regarding how they may be used to form a hand), but are dealt identically afterward. In Double Texas Hold'em, each player receives 3 hole cards and establishes a middle common card that plays with each of the other cards, but the outer cards don't play with each other (each player has two 2-card hands). Alternatively, in Double-board hold'em all players receive the same number of private cards, but there are two sets of community cards. The winner is either selected for each individual board with each receiving half of the pot, or the best overall hand takes the entire pot, depending on the rules agreed upon by the players.

Another variant is known as Greek hold 'em which requires each player to use both hole cards and only 3 from the board instead of the best five of seven cards.

Manila is a hold'em variant that was once popular in Australia. In Manila, players receive two private cards from a reduced deck (containing no cards lower than 7). A five-card board is dealt, unlike Texas hold 'em, one card at a time; there is a betting round after each card. Manila has several variations of its own, similar to the variants listed above.

Six-plus hold 'em (also known as Short-deck hold 'em) is a community card poker game variant of Texas hold 'em, where cards 2 through 5 are removed. Each player is dealt two cards face down and seeks to make his or her best five-card poker hand using from any combination of the seven cards (five community cards and their two hole cards).

== See also ==
- Glossary of poker terms
- Greek hold 'em
- List of poker hands
- Poker probability
- Omaha hold'em
