= Greek hold 'em =

Community card poker game

- Alternative names: Tight hold 'em
- Type: Community card poker
- Players: 2-10
- Skills: Probability, psychology
- Cards: 52
- Deck: French
- Rank (high→low): A K Q J 10 9 8 7 6 5 4 3 2
- Play: Clockwise
- Chance: Low to Medium

Greek hold 'em (originally known as tight hold 'em) is a community card poker game variant of Texas hold 'em which transitioned into Omaha hold 'em. Greek hold 'em combines the rules of Texas hold 'em and current day Omaha hold 'em. In professional poker player Doyle Brunson's book, Super/System, this version of poker was referred to as tight hold 'em.

== Rules ==
Greek hold 'em follows the same rules as Omaha, except that each player is only dealt two cards, same as in Texas hold 'em. In Greek hold 'em each player must use both hole cards along with 3 of the total available community cards to make the strongest five card hand, unlike Texas hold 'em where each player may play the best five card poker hand from any combination of the seven cards available to them.

== History ==
Greek hold 'em is called a transitional game between Texas and Omaha hold 'em. The game was commonly played during the 1960s in Memphis at the Greek club. Another variant was Spit in the Ocean, both are considered early variations of Omaha. In the late 1970s, Robert Turner introduced Greek hold 'em to Bill Boyd manager of the Golden Nugget at the time. By 1982, the two decided on four hole cards instead of two.

== See also ==
- Six-plus hold 'em
- Texas hold 'em
- Omaha hold 'em
