= Feeding The Rat =

1988 book by Al Alvarez

Feeding the Rat
- Author: Al Alvarez
- Language: English
- Genre: non-fiction, mountaineering, climbing
- Publisher: Bloomsbury
- Publication date: 1988

Feeding the Rat Is a book authored by Al Alvarez. The text explores a central theme of the psychological drive to climb mountains. In this book, Al Alvarez frequently relates the biographical stories and philosophy of his companion Mo Anthoine to convey the emotional range that can be experienced in a life of mountaineering. Mo was a passionate climber, and has been described as equal in skill to more famous mountaineers of the era such as Chris Bonington or Doug Scott.

== Summary ==
The overall focus is on mountaineering adventures with a philosophical air. In Feeding the Rat, Al Alvarez discusses the emotions at the heart of climbing and how deeper knowledge of the self can be gained through suffering, strife, and challenge. The author leads the reader through a dissection of the spiritual and soulful elements within the sport of mountaineering. The text doesn't just focus on positive climbing experiences; there are also some big falls described in its chapters, such as the ill-fated Ogre mountain expedition.

Structurally, the chapters are not thematically connected and aren't always about mountaineering. In this sense, Feeding the Rat breaks from the traditional style of mountaineering books of the period, which tended to keep an unwavering focus on expedition experience. In addition to mountaineering, the book also delves into home improvement, running a business making and selling outdoor equipment, and even the bonds of friendship.

== Chapters ==
- Llanberis
- The Dolomites
- Epics
- Tyn-y-Ffynnon
- Road to Roraima
- Feeding the Rat
- The Pleasure Principle
- Snowdon Mouldings
- The Mission
- The Old Man of Hoy
- Everest

== Reception and notable reviews ==
Feeding the Rat has been a literary staple amongst the climbing and mountaineering community, and is heralded as an effective means to describe the attraction of climbing to non-climbers. In the same year of its release the book was praised in a New Yorker profile. Feeding the rat remains in print.

== Unconventional book title ==
The name derives from a phrase Mo Anthoine commonly uses to describe his need to go climbing, he calls it "feeding the rat". A quote from the book describes the title "That's why I like feeding the rat. It's a sort of annual check-up on myself. The rat is you, really. It's the other you, and it's being fed by the you, you think you really are". A related quote by Mo Anthoine and included in the book is as follows, "To snuff it without knowing who you are and what you are capable of, I can't think of anything sadder than that."
