= Hemel Hempstead Evening Post-Echo =

The Evening Post-Echo was a British newspaper published in Hemel Hempstead and launched in 1967.

This newspaper was notable for three reasons:

1. It used the then cutting-edge technology of photo-typesetting at a time when the old 'hot metal' process was the norm.

2. It was one of the few non-national newspapers to publish six days a week.

3. It was neither national nor local, but a regional newspaper covering three counties (Bedfordshire, Buckinghamshire and Hertfordshire).

From launch, the paper flourished and grew, attaining a circulation of over 90,000 copies per night at its peak.

== Background to launch ==
Launched initially as two papers, the Evening Post and Evening Echo, it was an attempt by the Thomson Organization, then Britain's biggest newspaper group, to break the Beaverbrook and Northcliffe domination of the London-Home Counties evening paper market. Two other papers – the Slough Evening Mail and the Reading Evening Post – were part of this strategy. Lord (Roy) Thomson invested millions in the experiment, which he believed would profit from what he saw as huge advertising potential in prosperous communities north and west of London.

His efforts were thwarted from the start by demands from the print unions, which insisted on unsustainable manning levels. Thomson management was less robust than it might have been because it feared union repercussions at Times Newspapers, publishers of the Times and Sunday Times.

== Journalists ==
Many Fleet Street figures such as Peter Wright cut their teeth at the newspaper, which was edited in its early days by Ivor Lewis (former Sunday Times) and Richard Parrack, who was later to become a senior executive with News International. Other outstanding journalists worked on the Post-Echo in its heyday. They included Melanie Phillips (Daily Mail), Stephen Pile (Sunday Telegraph), David Francis (Mail on Sunday), Cliff Barr (The Sun, Daily Express), Lee Harrison and John Cathcart (National Enquirer), Anthony Holden (Sunday Times and The Observer), Maurice Chittenden (Sunday Times), Jean Ritchie (The Sun), Mark Milner (The Guardian), Michael Bilton ( Sunday Times ) and David Felton (The Independent).

The Post-Echo's assistant editor, John Marquis, who worked in London for both Reuters and Thomson Newspapers, became one of the few newspaper editors ever credited with bringing down a national government while editing The Tribune in Nassau, Bahamas, in 2007. While on the Post-Echo he won the Provincial Journalist of the Year award for exposing negligence at two hospitals. Melanie Phillips won the Young Journalist of the Year award the following year (1975).

Former Worcestershire and Young England cricketer Ivan Johnson trained and worked as a reporter and news sub-editor on the Post-Echo. Bahamas-born Johnson went on to work as a staff sub-editor on The London Sun and the Daily Star. Johnson founded and launched The Punch newspaper, a bi-weekly London-style popular quality tabloid, in Nassau, Bahamas, in February 1990. Johnson is the editor, owner and publisher of The Punch newspaper. The Punch was credited with bringing down the Old PLP Government of the late Bahamas Prime Minister Sir Lynden Pindling in August 1992. The Punch is considered by many to be The Bahamas' most read and controversial newspaper.

Several Post-Echo journalists became authors. Stephen Pile wrote The Book of Heroic Failures, Melanie Phillips the controversial Londonistan, Jean Ritchie a book about murderess Myra Hindley, and Ashley Walton The Duke of Hazard about Prince Philip. Anthony Holden became a biographer and also wrote a book about professional poker called Big Deal. John Marquis wrote Blood and Fire, about the famous murder of Sir Harry Oakes, and Papa Doc, about the Haitian dictator François Duvalier. Michael Bilton wrote books about the Falklands War, the My Lai Massacre and the Hunt for the Yorkshire Ripper.

== Design and photography ==
In its early days, the Post-Echo won many design awards, using offset printing to produce bold broadsheet pages with imaginative use of pictures. It regularly outshone its London rivals, the Evening News and Evening Standard, on the newsstands and was seen by many Fleet Street observers of the day as the future of newspapers. One of the Evening Post photographers, Alun John went on to become the award-winning launch Picture Editor of The Independent.

== Famous articles and awards ==
In 1973 it published a powerful and much-praised series of articles about the poisoner Graham Young which resulted in a book by Tony Holden called The St Albans Poisoner. He was one of a four-man investigation team led by Marquis, which included Lee Harrison and reporter Philip Smith, both of whom later worked on The National Enquirer in the United States.

However, it was Marquis's hospitals investigation the following year which landed the Post-Echo its first major writing award, with Phillips taking her award 12 months later.

== Demise ==
Despite its editorial excellence, the Post-Echo eventually bowed to the inexorable rise of freesheets and their demands on advertising revenue and the deep recession of the early 80s eventually saw its demise. It closed in 1983 with the loss of 470 jobs.

At the time of its closure, the editor was Trevor Wade, who went on to edit the Reading Evening Post.
