= Andrew Beal =

American banker, businessman, investor, and amateur mathematician

Andy Beal
- Born: Daniel Andrew Beal; November 29, 1952 (age 73); Lansing, Michigan, U.S.
- Occupation: Businessman
- Known for: Majority owner and chairman, Beal Bank
- Political party: Libertarian
- Spouse(s): Susan Kaminski (divorced); Simona Beal (divorced)
- Children: 9
- Website: Official website

Daniel Andrew Beal (born November 29, 1952) is an American banker, businessman, investor, and amateur mathematician. He is a Dallas-based businessman who accumulated wealth in real estate and banking. Born and raised in Lansing, Michigan, Beal is founder and chairman of Beal Bank and Beal Bank USA, as well as other affiliated companies. According to the 2025 Forbes List of Billionaires, Beal has an estimated worth of US$12 billion.

A number theorist, Beal is also known for the Beal conjecture, a mathematical generalization of Fermat's Last Theorem. He has funded a $1 million standing prize for its proof or disproof. His banks sponsor two annual science and technology fairs affiliated with the International Science & Engineering Fair. Beal participated in some high-stakes poker games in the mid-2000s that were the subject of a book.

== Early life and education ==
Beal grew up in Lansing, Michigan, where his mother worked in state government, and his father was a mechanical engineer. His siblings include an older brother and a younger sister. As a teenager, Beal began earning money by fixing and reselling used televisions with the help of his uncle. While attending high school he also installed apartment security systems. He also started a business moving houses and managed rental properties.

Beal excelled on his high school debate team at Lansing Sexton High School and went on to enroll at Michigan State University, where he studied mathematics.

== Business ventures and investments ==
=== Real estate investing ===
At age 19, Beal became a real estate investor when he bought a house in Lansing for $6,500 and started leasing it for $119 per month. Beal became known for buying properties, renovating them, and selling them. In 1976, he attended an auction of federal properties in Washington, DC and bid on an apartment building in Waco, Texas. His winning bid was $217,500. Three years later he sold the building for more than $1 million. Also in 1976, he enrolled at Baylor University in Waco, but left to focus on business endeavors.

In 1981, Beal and a partner bought two housing project buildings in disrepair, the Brick Towers in Newark, New Jersey, for $25,000. Two years later, they sold the repaired buildings for $3.2 million to a private investor. In 2017, he sold his Dallas, Texas estate, listed previously for $132 million, through Concierge Auctions for $36.2 million.

=== Beal Bank and Beal Bank USA ===
In 1988, Beal opened a bank in Dallas, and in 2004, another in Las Vegas. Since then, the banks have purchased financial assets and held them as the market improved. The banks’ purchases have included:

- Power generation and infrastructure bonds during the post-Enron California rolling blackouts and energy-deregulation crisis in 2001
- Debt instruments backed by aircraft after the 9/11 terrorist attacks on the US
- Commercial and real estate loans during the global credit crisis of 2008

Based on the Uniform Bank Performance Report from the Federal Financial Institutions Examination Council, Beal Bank's return on assets (ROA) was 8.1 in 2008, several times in excess of its peer group (insured savings banks with assets greater than $1 billion). From 2009 to 2012 Beal Bank generally exceeded its peer group.

Beal Bank USA's ROA is generally several times in excess of its peer group (insured commercial banks with assets greater than $3 billion).

Beal Bank and Beal Bank USA report combined total capital in excess of $2.7 billion and combined total assets in excess of $7.2 billion as of June 2019.

They have a total of 37 branch locations and offer online banking also. Both banks are members of and are insured by the Federal Deposit Insurance Corporation (FDIC). They offer deposit products to the public including CDs, money market accounts, statement savings accounts, and IRA CD accounts that are insured by the FDIC. Because they do not offer consumer loans or checking accounts, the banks are considered wholesale banks. Both banks purchase pools of non-agency residential first liens and commercial real estate-secured loans in order to fund commercial loans and participations in loans and syndications, through affiliates.

Beal's major businesses as of 2021 include:

- Beal Bank, based in Dallas
- Beal Bank USA, based in Las Vegas, NV, and founded in August 2004 (formerly Beal Bank Nevada)
- CSG Investments. Inc., based in Dallas
- Loan Acquisition Corporation, based in Dallas
- CLG Hedge Fund, LLC, based in Dallas

=== Beal Aerospace ===
In 1997, as part of a space privatization trend encouraged by the federal government, Beal started an aerospace company to build rockets with the goal of placing communications satellites in orbit. Operating with more than 200 employees from a 163,000-square-foot space in Frisco, Texas, Beal Aerospace focused on a three-stage, 200-foot-tall rocket. Powered by hydrogen peroxide and kerosene, the engine eliminated the need for a separate ignition system because, as the hydrogen peroxide oxidized, it ignited the kerosene.

Facing competition from NASA's Space Launch Initiative, Beal closed the company and ceased operations on October 23, 2000. Beal cited NASA's commercial practices as the primary reason for closing, including the difficulty private-sector launch systems face when competing with the governmental subsidies of NASA.

=== Philanthropy ===
Beal has donated millions of dollars to support science and math initiatives. Through his banks, Beal is an annual title sponsor of:

- The Dallas Regional Science and Engineering Fair, affiliated with Southern Methodist University
- The South Nevada Regional Science and Engineering Fair, affiliated with the University of Nevada, Las Vegas

Both fairs are sanctioned events of the International Science & Engineering Fair, and open to students in grades 6 through 12 with winners moving on to national and international competitions.

Beal Bank was the sponsor for the Chemistry category of the International Science and Engineering Fair (ISEF), held in Dallas in May 2023.

Beal also donated $1 million to the Perot Museum of Nature and Science in Dallas, which opened in December 2012. Beal's companies donated more than 200 computers to the Dallas Independent School District for student use.

== Beal conjecture ==
In 1993, Beal released the Beal conjecture, that implies Fermat's Last Theorem as a corollary. To encourage research on the conjecture, Beal funded a standing prize of $1 million for its proof or disproof. The funds are held in trust by the American Mathematical Society, and an informational website on the Beal Conjecture is hosted by the University of North Texas.

As of September 2026, the Beal Conjecture prize remains unclaimed.

== Poker ==
During visits to Las Vegas between 2001 and 2004, Beal participated in high-stakes poker games against professional players. The games included $100,000 to $200,000 limit Texas Hold 'Em poker. On May 13, 2004, at the Las Vegas Bellagio, Beal won one of the largest single hands in poker history at $11.7 million. The games have been chronicled in the Michael Craig book The Professor, the Banker, and the Suicide King: Inside the Richest Poker Game of All Time.

While the games outlined in Craig's book ended in 2004, Beal returned to Las Vegas from February 1–5, 2006 to again take on "The Corporation" in a $50,000/100,000 Limit Hold 'Em match at the Wynn Las Vegas Casino. Opponents included Todd Brunson, Jennifer Harman, Ted Forrest, and others.

On February 5, 2006, Beal was down $3.3 million. He then returned to the Wynn Casino a week later, and won approximately $13.6 million from the corporation during daily poker sessions from February 12 to 15. The games resumed February 21 to 23, with world champion poker player Phil Ivey representing the Corporation against Beal at limits of $30,000/60,000 and $50,000/100,000. During these three days, Beal lost $16.6 million to Ivey. According to Jennifer Harman, during an interview on Poker Podcast with Daniel Negreanu on October 26, 2016, the games went as high as $100,000/200,000.

In December 2019, Beal lost a total of $15.6 million in a high-stakes poker match to actor Tobey Maguire and others; Maguire's share was $7.8 million.

== Personal life ==
He has two children with his first wife. In 1996, he married Estonian immigrant Simona Beal. They have four children. Simona filed for divorce in 2010. Beal has three children with Olya Sinitsyna.

Beal is a libertarian. In the 2016 United States presidential election, Beal initially endorsed Rand Paul, donating $250,000 to the senator's campaign. Following Paul's exit from the race, Beal endorsed Donald Trump. Beal was an economic adviser to Trump's 2016 campaign. Beal donated $2 million to a Trump super PAC in September 2016, and another $1 million for the inaugural festivities according to Forbes. Beal gave more than $4 million to Trump committees and other GOP groups in 2020, and $1.8 million for Trump’s 2024 bid.

In the aftermath of the January 2021 storming of the United States Capitol, an assistant to Beal told Bloomberg News that Beal "doesn't know what happened ... and he doesn't believe mainstream news reporting anymore."
