= Poker in 1981 =

This article summarizes the events related to the world of poker in 1981.

== Major Tournaments ==
=== 1981 World Series of Poker ===
Stu Ungar wins the main tournament.

=== 1981 Super Bowl of Poker ===
Junior whited wins the main tournament.

== Poker Hall of Fame ==
Bill Boyd is inducted
