= Beal Bank =

American bank

Beal Financial Corporation
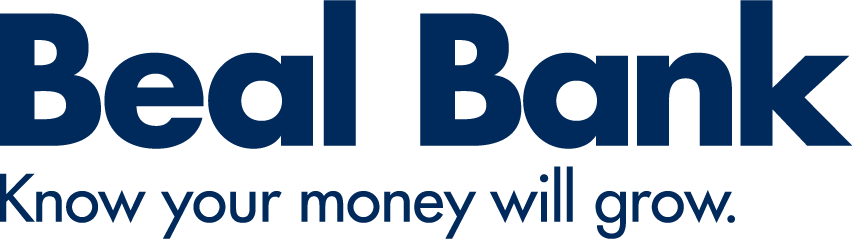
- Company type: Private
- Industry: Bank
- Founded: March 10, 1988; 38 years ago
- Founder: Andrew Beal
- Headquarters: Plano, Texas
- Owner: Andrew Beal
- Website: www.bealbank.com
Footnotes / references
Beal Bank
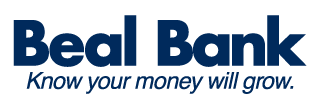
- Number of locations: 5
- Total assets: $4.843 billion (2024)
Beal Bank USA
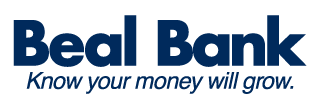
- Company type: Bank
- Founded: August 2, 2004
- Headquarters: Las Vegas, Nevada
- Number of locations: 11
- Total assets: $18.030 billion (2024)

Beal Financial Corporation is a bank holding company based in Plano, Texas that operates two federally chartered banks: Beal Bank, with 5 branches, and Beal Bank USA, headquartered in Las Vegas, Nevada, with 10 branches and a direct bank. It is on the list of largest banks in the United States. It was founded by and is entirely owned by billionaire Andrew Beal and specializes in acquiring distressed securities at discounted values. It acquires risky loans, but keeps a much higher equity buffer than other banks.

== History ==
Beal Bank was founded on March 10, 1988 in Dallas, TX by Andrew Beal. It began with $3 million in capital and a single branch in Carrollton, Texas. During the savings and loan crisis, the bank purchased assets and real estate from failing banks and the Resolution Trust Corporation, a government-owned company that liquidated real estate and savings-and-loan assets. By 1996, the bank was the most profitable bank in Texas.

In 2000, the company acquired $1 billion of face value in commercial loans from the Small Business Administration at a discount.

After the September 11 attacks, the company invested in distressed securities of airline companies.

In 2003, the company acquired Southern Pacific Bank based in Torrance, California, with three branches and $834 million in deposits, after it was shut down by regulators.

On August 2, 2004, it opened Beal Savings Bank headquartered in Las Vegas, Nevada. It was renamed Beal Bank USA in 2012.

Beginning in 2004, the bank became a major lender to Donald Trump's casino properties while they went through bankruptcy, also offering to acquire the casinos outright.

Between 2004 and 2007, the company slowed its asset acquisition and began to let its loans run off, as the founder was correctly worried about an impending crisis. Assets shrank from $7.7 billion to $2.9 billion.

From 2008-2009, Beal Bank expanded, hiring analysts and evaluating mortgage bonds, debt and other assets being sold by financial institutions as a result of the 2008 financial crisis. By 2009, the company had purchased nearly $5 billion in assets, including $1.8 billion in residential loans, a $465 million loan to LyondellBasell, and assets from 15 failed banks in the U.S.

In April 2009, the company moved its headquarters from Dallas to Plano after buying the former headquarters of Petrofina.

In December 2009, Beal Bank acquired New South Federal Savings Bank based in Irondale, Alabama, with $1.5 billion in assets.

In January 2010, Beal Bank acquired Charter Bank of Santa Fe. Its branches were sold to WaFd Bank in June 2011.

In 2016, the bank acquired Sundevil Holdings LLC, the owner of two gas-fired power plants in Arizona, for a credit bid of $150 million after the company filed bankruptcy. It sold the units for $330 million in 2017. Beal argued before federal regulators that California policies discriminated against generators powered by fossil fuels and “left [the state] dependent on energy sources that are unreliable for round-the-clock power”. Regulators determined in June 2019 that clean-energy providers had been “receiving unfair subsidies that allowed them to submit low bids to power purchasers”. According to the New York Times, Beal’s complaint against this discrimination aimed to “create a fair market and ensure system reliability, not to impede California’s transition to a carbon-free electric grid”.

In November 2020, the bank acquired the $1 billion Campus at Legacy West development via foreclosure.

In 2022, the bank invested heavily in Treasury Inflation-Protected Securities.

As of December 31, 2024, Beal Financial Corporation reported total assets of $22.75 billion and total equity capital of $3.82 billion.
