= Ivan Johnson (cricketer) =

English cricketer (1953–2021)

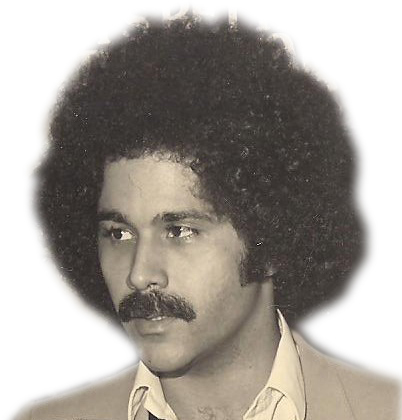
- Johnson in 1975

Personal information
- Born: 27 June 1953; Nassau, Bahamas
- Died: 4 October 2021 (aged 68)
- Nickname: Johnners, Bomber
- Height: 5 ft 9 in (175 cm)
- Batting: Left-handed
- Bowling: Slow left arm orthodox
- Role: All-rounder

Career statistics
Competition	First-class	List A
Matches	33	38
Runs scored	716	279
Batting average	21.69	10.33
100s/50s	0/5	0/0
Top score	69	36*
Balls bowled	3,260	1,195
Wickets	37	25
Bowling average	41.43	31.60
5 wickets in innings	1	0
10 wickets in match	0	0
Best bowling	5/74	3/21
Catches/stumpings	13/0	6/0
- Source: Cricinfo

Ivan Nicholas Johnson (27 June 1953 – 4 October 2021) was a professional, all rounder, English first-class cricketer who played for Worcestershire County Cricket Club from 1972 to 1975.

Johnson was the only Bahamian to have played professional cricket at the first-class and junior Test cricket level. In his four seasons at Worcestershire, Johnson won runners-up medals in the 1972 John Player League and the 1973 Benson & Hedges Cup. In 1974, the Worcestershire team, which included Imran Khan, won the County Championship.

Johnson was also the only Bahamian to have worked as a staff sub-editor and journalist on newspapers in Fleet Street. In 1990, Johnson founded The Punch, a controversial Bahamian tabloid newspaper.

== Early life and education ==
Johnson was born in 1953 in Nassau, Bahamas, to a Bahamian father and an English mother.

=== Family ===
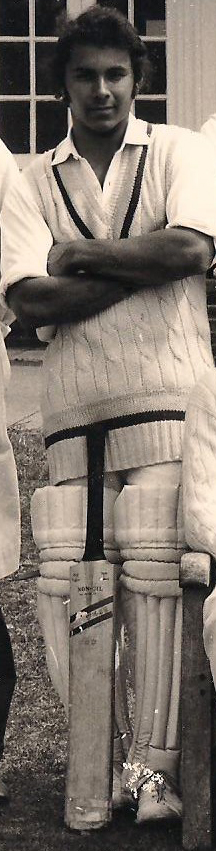
Johnson in 1971 after scoring 126 not out for Old Malvernians at Eastbourne College

Johnson's father, Basil L. I. Johnson, CBE DFM RAFVR was a World War II flight sergeant. In 1943 and 1944, Basil Johnson flew fifty war-time bombing missions in Avro Lancaster bomber aircraft for the Pathfinder (RAF) 156 squadron. He was the only black Bahamian to fly in the British Royal Air Force during World War II.

Johnson's grandfather, Thomas Tot Walsh, was a professional footballer who was a centre-forward for the Bolton Wanderers and Crystal Palace. In 1923, Walsh was the twelfth man for the Football Association Cup final, known as the White Horse Final, where Bolton beat West Ham 2 to 0 at Wembley. On 15 January 1927, he scored a double hat-trick in a 9 to 4 win for Bristol City against Gillingham.

=== Education ===
Johnson was educated at Queen's College, Nassau, Bahamas and the Seaford Court Preparatory School at Malvern Link, Worcestershire. His high school education was completed at Malvern College where he took O and A levels. His A levels included English literature and Spanish. He later studied Spanish during a summer break at the University of Valladolid.

== Cricketer ==
Johnson batted left-handed and bowled orthodox slow left-arm spin.

=== Junior cricketing (1966 to 1971) ===
In 1966, at age 13, Johnson was the first boy to score a century for Seaford Court Preparatory School. In that year, during his last summer at Seaford Court, he hit three hundreds, including one score of 150 not out. The headmaster, Geoffrey Milton, himself an Old Malvernian, was proud of Johnson's outstanding batting performances. However, Milton bemoaned the fact that Johnson cost him a fortune in lost cricket balls by constantly hitting balls out of the school's grounds. Johnson was the first and (as yet) only boy to hit a straight six, a huge distance over the sight screen, into the adjoining field.

From 1968 to 1971, Johnson was a player in the Malvern XI and was its captain in 1971. He played for the All-England Schools senior and junior (Under-16s) teams. He was also a member of Malvern's soccer first XI in the 1969 to 1970 season and the rackets first pair in the 1970 to 1971 season.

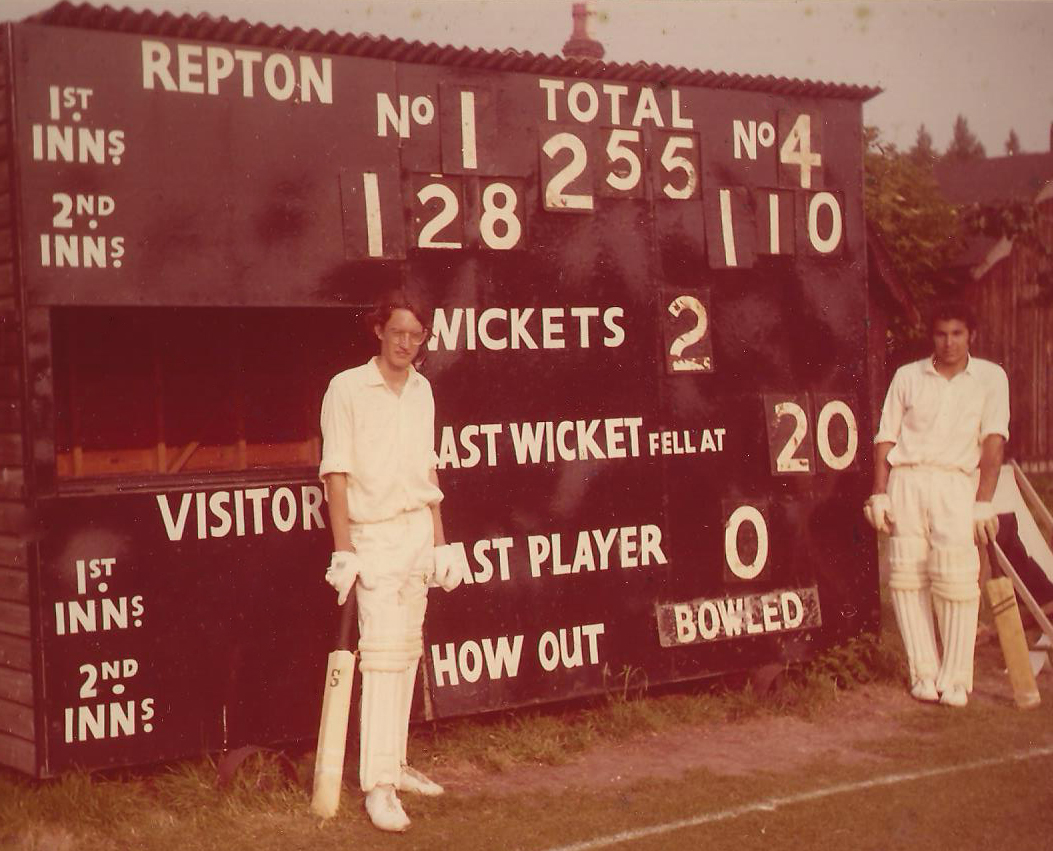
Johnson and Michael Barnard, Repton, 1971

=== First-class cricket debut ===
From 1969 onwards, he played several Second XI matches for Worcestershire County Cricket Club in his summer holidays. In 1971, he played in two games for the Northamptonshire County Cricket Club seconds. In 1972, he topped the batting averages for the Young England Under-19 cricket team on a tour of the West Indies. He scored a total of 438 runs with an average of 62.57.

In June 1972, at age 18, Johnson made his first-class debut for Worcestershire in a drawn match against Oxford University. Johnson took the wickets of Michael Heal and Barry May in Oxford's only innings and made 7 and then 1 not out. He was retained for the County Championship match against Warwickshire County Cricket Club, taking 0 for 28 in eight overs in a match that was rained off.

In July 1972, Johnson took 7 for 57 for the Second XI against Warwickshire II and then was recalled to the firsts, where he remained for six games, three at first-class and three in List A. In a John Player League one-day match, Johnson took two vital wickets, allowing Worcestershire to beat Nottinghamshire by 38 runs. On 17 July 1972, the Daily Telegraph front page read "Johnson Wrecks Notts". Worcestershire placed second in the league that year.

=== Young England tour of West Indies ===
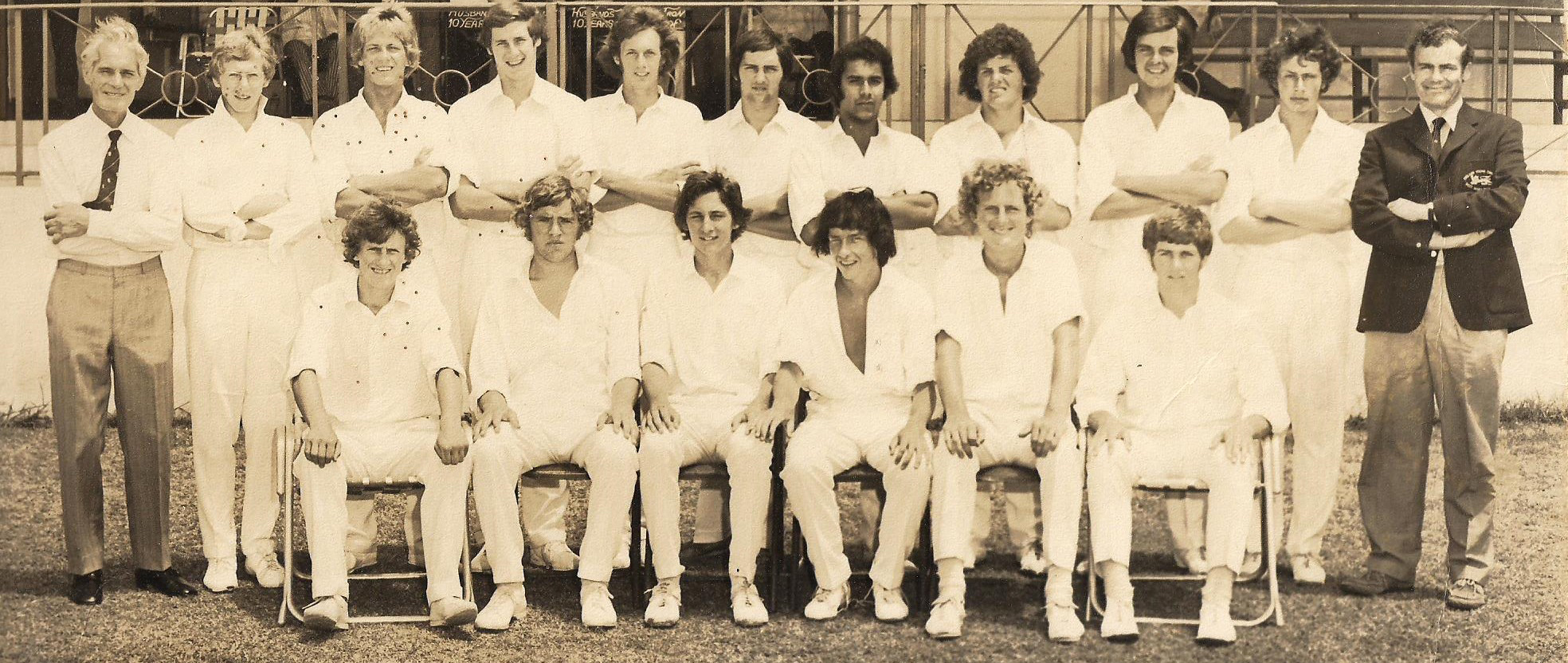
Johnson, back row, 7th from left, Young England 1972 in Barbados.

Johnson spent the remainder of the 1972 season on a tour of the West Indies with the England Under-19 cricket team. He topped the batting averages in the junior test matches. He scored 438 runs, including a century and three half-centuries, at an average of 62.57. He was the only Young England player to score a century on the tour. In Jamaica, Johnson scored 110 not out at Jarrett Park and 74 at Sabina Park. In Barbados, he scored 70 and 82 not out at Kensington Oval. In Trinidad, he scored 26 at Queen's Park Oval and in Guyana, he scored 21 at Bourda and in Nevis he scored 36 at Grove Park, Charlestown. He took wickets with his slow left-arm spin bowling, notably 4 for 37 at Bourda in Georgetown, Guyana. The Young England team also played in Antigua and Saint Vincent.

=== Final at Lord's ===
1973 was Johnson's best year in professional cricket. He played 21 first-class games, scoring 475 runs at 20.65, including three half-centuries, and took 15 wickets, albeit at an average of 51. He scored 54 against Middlesex at Lord's. In his 24 one-day matches he fared better, claiming 15 wickets at 27.20; he also contributed some useful runs from number seven or eight.

In 1973, Johnson scored a valuable 27 in the Benson & Hedges semi-final against Lancashire at Old Trafford. During his innings, he told Basil D'Oliveira that his bat seemed to be middling the ball with exceptional power and sweet timing. D'Oliveira looked at the bat and exclaimed, "I'm not surprised. That's my number two bat!" Johnson had picked up the wrong bat in the pavilion changing room. Worcestershire won the low-scoring semi-final. The scores were tied on 159 but Worcestershire won because they had lost nine wickets to Lancashire's ten.

Johnson then played in the Benson & Hedges Cup final at Lord's before a crowd of 35,000. The match was televised on BBC Sport. Worcestershire were defeated in the final by Kent. Kent batted first making 225 for 7 in 55 overs. In reply, Worcestershire were bowled out for 186, losing by 39 runs. Johnson took 1 (the wicket of Alan Ealham) for 41 in his eight overs. He dropped an easy caught-and-bowled catch from Asif Iqbal, and the wicketkeeper, Rodney Cass, missed a chance to stump Brian Luckhurst from Johnson's bowling.

=== John Player League one-day game ===
In 1973, Johnson played in a John Player League 40-over one-day game for Worcestershire against Nottinghamshire at Dudley. Worcestershire required four runs from the last ball of the match to win. Leading up to this, Johnson and D'Oliveira had added 67 runs and Johnson had taken 1 for 26 in his eight overs. Johnson faced the last ball. Garry Sobers, the West Indies Test player, bowled the last ball. He delivered a full-length ball on off-stump. Johnson hit the ball towards the mid-off boundary. Pasty Harris, a fielder for Nottinghamshire, stopped the ball just before it went for four. Johnson was only able to take two runs and finished 36 not out. Nottinghamshire won the match by two runs.

=== New Zealand ===
In 1973, Johnson played for Worcestershire against the touring New Zealand team at Worcester. He scored 36 not out to help Worcestershire avoid a follow-on. New Zealand made a large first innings total, with the opener, Glenn Turner, scoring 143. When not touring with New Zealand, Turner was one of Worcestershire's international players. Early in Turner's innings, Johnson bowled and Alan Ormrod unusually, dropped at slip. As a result, Turner became the first man since World War II to score 1,000 first-class runs before the end of May.

=== 1974 ===
Johnson, back row, third from left, in team photo taken at Worcester New Road county ground of Worcs County Cricket Club playing staff in 1974.

In 1974, at Hull, Johnson played in a memorable match against Yorkshire. In 1980 in his autobiography, Time to Declare, D'Oliveira wrote that Johnson scored a useful 27 runs to help D'Oliveira to 227, his highest score in first-class cricket. The Yorkshire bowler Richard Hutton, grew increasingly frustrated with Johnson, who was making streaky shots through the slips and gully area off Hutton's medium-pace bowling. Finally, when Johnson thick-edged a ball for four, Hutton told Johnson, "Why don't you (expletive) off back onto the Robertson's jam jar, you Golliwog." Everybody, including Johnson, fell about laughing. Hutton meant that Johnson's high afro hair-style resembled the Golliwog trademark on the Robertson's jam jar labels. As D'Oliveira's nickname was Dolly, the Worcestershire players jokingly dubbed this incident "The Dolly and Golly Show".

Again in 1974, at a John Player League one-day game against Northamptonshire, opening batsman Colin Milburn was making a comeback for Northamptonshire. In 1969, Milburn had retired after losing the sight in his left eye in a car crash. He returned as a medium-pace bowler and middle-order batsman. As he was running in to bowl to Johnson, Milburn stopped mid-stride and shouted: "Don't move, anybody!" The puzzled umpire asked Milburn what was wrong. "My glass eye fell out. I don't want anyone to step on it," replied Milburn. Milburn, the umpire and a couple of Northants players crawled around on their knees searching for Milburn's glass eye in the grass. Suddenly Milburn yelled, "I've found it," as he waved his glass eye in the air. Water was brought on to the field so that Milburn could clean the eye. He then popped it back into its socket and carried on bowling to Johnson.

=== 1975 - 1976 ===
In this period, Johnson played only sporadically. He did, however, make two first-class career bests. In May, against Nottinghamshire, he scored 69. In June, in what became his last first-team match, he claimed 5 for 74 in the second innings against Oxford University.

Early in 1975, at age 21, Johnson announced his plan to leave the Worcestershire team in the following September to pursue an interest in journalism. He did play for the Old Malvernians in The Cricketer Cup, a 55-overs per team knock-out competition for the Old Boys of Britain's thirty-two leading private schools. Johnson played two match-winning innings to propel the Old Malvernians to the Cup final. He top-scored with 70 runs against Old Tonbridgians and 72 runs against the Old Carthusians. In the final at Burton's Court, the Old Malvernians beat the Old Harrovians by 97 runs. Johnson scored 21 runs and took 3 wickets for 22 in 9.3 overs. The Old Malvernian winners' prize was a weekend trip to the sponsor, Moët et Chandon's vineyards in Epernay.

=== Celebrity team matches ===
After leaving Worcestershire, Johnson played occasional games of cricket for club and charity teams. While working as a newspaper sub-editor, Johnson played for the El Vino's XI, a team named for El Vino's, a wine bar and restaurant on Fleet Street. Johnson went on tours with El Vino's XI to Alderney, Jersey, Guernsey and Gibraltar.

== Squash ==
After retiring from cricket, Johnson played squash. He was a captain of the Hampstead-Abraxas squash club. In the early 1980s, the club won the division two championship. From 1985 to 1987, while a sub-editor in Australia, Johnson played in the Sydney pennant championship for the Hiscoes squash club of Surry Hills, Sydney. He also played for the Bahamas in the North Caribbean Squash Championships in 1995.

== Journalism ==
From 1972, during the English county cricket off-season winter months, Johnson was employed as a trainee reporter on The Tribune newspaper in Nassau. In October 1975, he became a trainee journalist with Thomson Newspapers, owned by Lord Thomson of Fleet. He worked at the Hemel Hempstead Evening Post-Echo and studied at the Harlow College of Journalism in Essex. This training was followed by one year's cadetship at Reuters.

=== Conflict with the Bahamian Prime Minister ===
Johnson returned to Nassau in 1976. At The Tribune, the national newspaper, two chief reporters had quit without warning. Johnson agreed to act as the newspaper's chief reporter up to the 1977 general election. In October 1976, he clashed with the Progressive Liberal Party leader, Prime Minister Lynden Pindling during the ZNS-TV radio programme, Contact. Contact was a monthly live broadcast where Sir Lynden was questioned by journalists. Sir Lynden became angry when answering Johnson's questions. In November 1976, Sir Lynden refused to appear with Johnson. Johnson continued to goad Sir Lynden in The Tribune. After the 1977 election, Johnson returned to England and in 1979 he gained employment at The London Sun as a sub-editor.

In 1985, Johnson was seconded to Australia and worked as a sub-editor at The Daily Mirror (Australia), The Townsville Bulletin and The Sunday Times (Western Australia). In 1987, Johnson again returned to London. He worked as a freelance sub-editor for the London Sun, News of the World and The Sunday Times before gaining employment as a staff sub-editor at the Daily Star.

=== The Punch ===
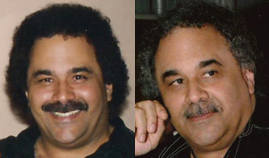
Ivan Johnson in 1996 and 2012

In August 1989 Johnson returned to Nassau. In February 1990 he began his own tabloid format newspaper, The Punch. Its offices were on Farrington Road in Oakes Field. In 1992, on the morning of election day, The Punch ran a headline predicting the Free National Movement win over Progressive Liberal Party by 32 seats to 17. The tabloid was hence called The Prophet Punch.

== Death ==
Johnson died on 4 October 2021 at the age of 68 after a heart attack.
