= California Club (casino) =

Historic casino in Las Vegas, Nevada

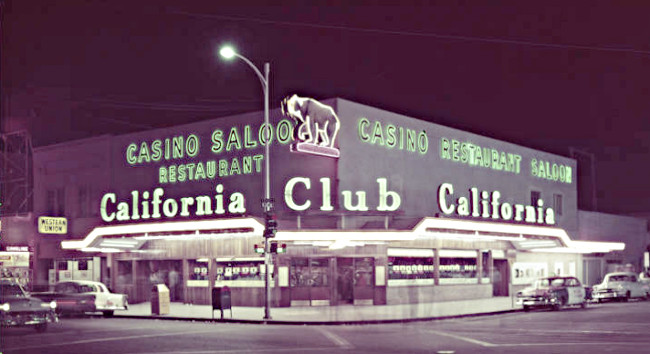

- Location: Las Vegas, Nevada
- Address: Fremont Street
- Opening date: 1958
- Closing date: 1973
- Theme: Gold Rush
- Casino type: Land-based
- Owner: Phil Long and George Milford
- Coordinates: 36°10′23″N 115°08′41″W

The California Club operated from 1958 to 1973. Phil Long took over operation of the casino located at the corner of First and Fremont Street in Downtown Las Vegas, Nevada in 1958. The locals casino catered to local gamblers. It was owned and operated by Phil Long and George Milford and was a casino only without any hotel rooms. The California Club was sold to Steve Wynn in 1973. The California Club was combined into the Golden Nugget shortly after the purchase by Wynn.

In 1963, Corky McCorquodale introduced Texas hold'em to Las Vegas at the California Club. The game became popular and quickly spread to the Golden Nugget, Stardust and Dunes.

== Other California Clubs ==
There were two approved casinos in Reno that were also called California Club.
