= Anthony Holden =

English writer, broadcaster and critic (1947–2023)

- Born: 22 May 1947; Southport, Lancashire, England
- Died: 7 October 2023 (aged 76); London, England
- Education: Merton College, Oxford
- Occupations: Writer, broadcaster, critic
- Known for: Biographies of artists and members of the British royal family, Poker books
- Notable work: "Big Deal: A Year as a Professional Poker Player"
- Spouses: Amanda Warren (m. 1971; div. 1988); Cynthia Blake (m. 1990; sep. 2000)
- Children: 3 sons
- Awards: Young Journalist of the Year (1972)

Anthony Ivan Holden (22 May 1947 – 7 October 2023) was an English writer, broadcaster and literary critic, particularly known as a biographer of artists including Shakespeare, Tchaikovsky, essayist Leigh Hunt, opera librettist Lorenzo Da Ponte and actor Laurence Olivier, and of members of the British royal family, notably Charles, Prince of Wales. Holden also published translations of opera and Ancient Greek poetry, as well as several autobiographical books about poker. In 2009, he was elected the first President of the International Federation of Match Poker (IFMP).

== Early life and education ==
Holden was born in Southport, Lancashire, on 22 May 1947 to John Holden (1918–1985), an officer in the Manchester Regiment, and Margaret Lois (1918–1985), daughter of Ivan Sharpe, the England international footballer and Olympic gold medallist who later became a celebrated sports writer. Holden's father, John, was the second son of Sir George Holden, 2nd Baronet, of The Firs, Lancashire. Holden was educated at Trearddur House School, Anglesey, at Oundle School and at Merton College, Oxford, where he read English language and literature, edited the student magazine Isis and appeared on University Challenge.

== Career ==
A journalist before turning full-time writer, at the start of his career as a graduate trainee on Thomson Regional Newspapers' Hemel Hempstead Evening Post-Echo, Holden covered the trial in St Albans of the psychopathic poisoner Graham Young. His book on the case, The St. Albans Poisoner (1974), was filmed as The Young Poisoner's Handbook (1995). Named Young Journalist of the Year in 1972, he was on the staff of The Sunday Times (1973–79), commended in the British Press Awards in 1976 as News Reporter of the Year for his work in Northern Ireland, and winning Columnist of the Year in 1977. He was Washington Correspondent and US editor of The Observer (1979–81), Assistant Editor of The Times (1981–82), Executive Editor, Today, (1985–86), and chief classical music critic of The Observer (2002–08).

In 1999–2000, he was an inaugural Fellow of the Centre for Scholars and Writers at the New York Public Library. When he was a Whitbread Prize judge in 2000, he said it would have been a "national humiliation" if Harry Potter and the Prisoner of Azkaban had won, ahead of Seamus Heaney's translation of Beowulf. Holden had threatened to resign if that happened. The novelist Robert Harris derided this threat as "pompous".

Holden was a member of the Board of Governors of the Southbank Centre 2002–08, during the landmark renovation programme under the chairmanship of Lord Hollick. Since 2006, he was a Trustee of Shakespeare North Trust.

In May 2015, he gave the annual A. E. Housman lecture on the Name and Nature of Poetry at the Hay-on-Wye Festival.

Holden also made frequent appearances on television, presenting such documentaries as Charles at Forty (ITV, 1988), Anthony Holden on Poker (BBC 2, 1991) and Who Killed Tchaikovsky? (Omnibus, BBC 1, 1993). In the mid-1980s, he presented a weekly BBC Radio 4 chat show, In the Air.

Holden's papers are collected at Boston University's Howard Gotlieb Archival Research Center.

Holden was a dedicated Arsenal F.C. fan and had a season ticket to the Emirates Stadium.

== Poker ==
Holden was a keen poker player, and spent a year playing professionally while researching his 1990 book Big Deal: A Year as a Professional Poker Player (ISBN 0-7432-9481-5), which has been praised by poker enthusiasts from David Mamet and Salman Rushdie to Walter Matthau. The book covers his experiences between the World Series of Poker (WSOP) tournaments in 1988 and 1989.

In 2000, he won TV's first Celebrity Late Night Poker on Channel 4, beating Al Alvarez, Martin Amis, Victoria Coren, Ricky Gervais, Patrick Marber and Stephen Fry. In 2005, Holden appeared on the chat show Heads Up with Richard Herring to discuss his life, career and his love of poker. In 2006, he represented England in TV's World Cup of Poker, staged by PokerStars, for whom he was a sponsored player 2006–2008.

In 2007, Holden published Bigger Deal: A Year Inside the Poker Boom (ISBN 0-7432-9482-3), a journal of his second stint as a professional player, between the 2005 and 2006 WSOP events.

In 2009, he was elected the first President of the International Federation of Match Poker (IFMP) at its founding congress in Lausanne, Switzerland. After four years in office, he resigned in April 2013.

== Personal life and death ==
Holden married Amanda Warren in 1971. They had three sons and four grandchildren. They divorced in 1988 and in 1990 Holden married novelist Cynthia "Cindy" Blake. They separated in 2000, but did not divorce.

Holden died from a brain tumour and complications of a stroke at his home in London on 7 October 2023, at the age of 76.

== Works ==
- Aeschylus' Agamemnon (1969, translator and editor)
- Greek Pastoral Poetry (1973, translator and editor)
- The Greek Anthology (1973, contributor)
- The St Albans Poisoner: The Life And Crimes Of Graham Young (1974, reissued 1995 as The Young Poisoner's Handbook)
- Charles: Prince of Wales (1979); published as Prince Charles in US
- Their Royal Highnesses, The Prince and Princess of Wales (1981)
- A Week In The Life Of The Royal Family (1983)
- Great Royal Front Pages: A Scrapbook of Historic Royal Events from Queen Victoria to Baby Prince William (1983)
- Anthony Holden's Royal Quiz (1983)
- Of Presidents, Prime Ministers and Princes: A Decade in Fleet Street (1984, preface by Harold Evans)
- Queen Mother (1985)
- Don Giovanni: The Translation (1987, with Amanda Holden)
- Laurence Olivier: A Biography (1988, reissued 2007)
- Charles: A Biography (1988); published as King Charles III in US
- The Last Paragraph. The Journalism of David Blundy (1990, editor)
- Big Deal: A Year as a Professional Poker Player (1990)
- The Queen Mother: A 90th Birthday Tribute (1990)
- A Princely Marriage: Charles & Diana, the First Ten Years (1991)
- Behind The Oscar: The Secret History of the Academy Awards (1993)
- H.M. Queen Elizabeth the Queen Mother In Private (1993)
- The Tarnished Crown (1993), Viking Publishers, ISBN 0-670-84624-4.
- Tchaikovsky (1995)
- Diana: Her Life and Legacy (1997)
- Charles at Fifty (1998)
- William Shakespeare: His Life and Work (1999)
- Liber Amicorum for Frank Kermode (1999, editor with Ursula Owen)
- The Mind Has Mountains: a.alvarez@lxx (1999, editor with Frank Kermode)
- The Drama of Love, Life and Death in Shakespeare (2000)
- Shakespeare: An Illustrated Biography (2002)
- The Wit in the Dungeon (2005), biography of Leigh Hunt
- All In: Texas Hold'em as Played on Late-Night TV (2005)
- Lorenzo Da Ponte, The Man Who Wrote Mozart (2006)
- Olivier (2007, Max Press)
- Bigger Deal: A Year on the New Poker Circuit (2007)
- Holden on Hold'Em (2008)
- Poems That Make Grown Men Cry (2014, editor with Ben Holden)
- Poems That Make Grown Women Cry (2016, editor with Ben Holden)
- He Played For His Wife and other stories (2017, editor with Natalie Galustian)
- Based on a True Story: A Writer's Life (2021)

Media offices
Preceded by New position	Editor of Sunday Today; 1986	Succeeded by Peter McKay
