= Corky McCorquodale =

American poker player (1904–1968)

Felton McCorquodale
- Nickname: Corky
- Born: August 23, 1904; Fort Worth, Texas, U.S.
- Died: November 23, 1968 (aged 64)

Felton "Corky" McCorquodale (August 23, 1904 – November 23, 1968) was a professional poker player, noted as the person who introduced Texas hold 'em to Las Vegas in 1963.

Poker had been legal in Las Vegas since 1931, but Texas hold 'em was not played. In 1963, McCorquodale introduced Texas hold'em at the California Club in Las Vegas. The game became popular and quickly spread to the Golden Nugget, Stardust, and Dunes.

He was a posthumous charter inductee into the Poker Hall of Fame in 1979.
