= Omaha hold 'em =

Community card poker game

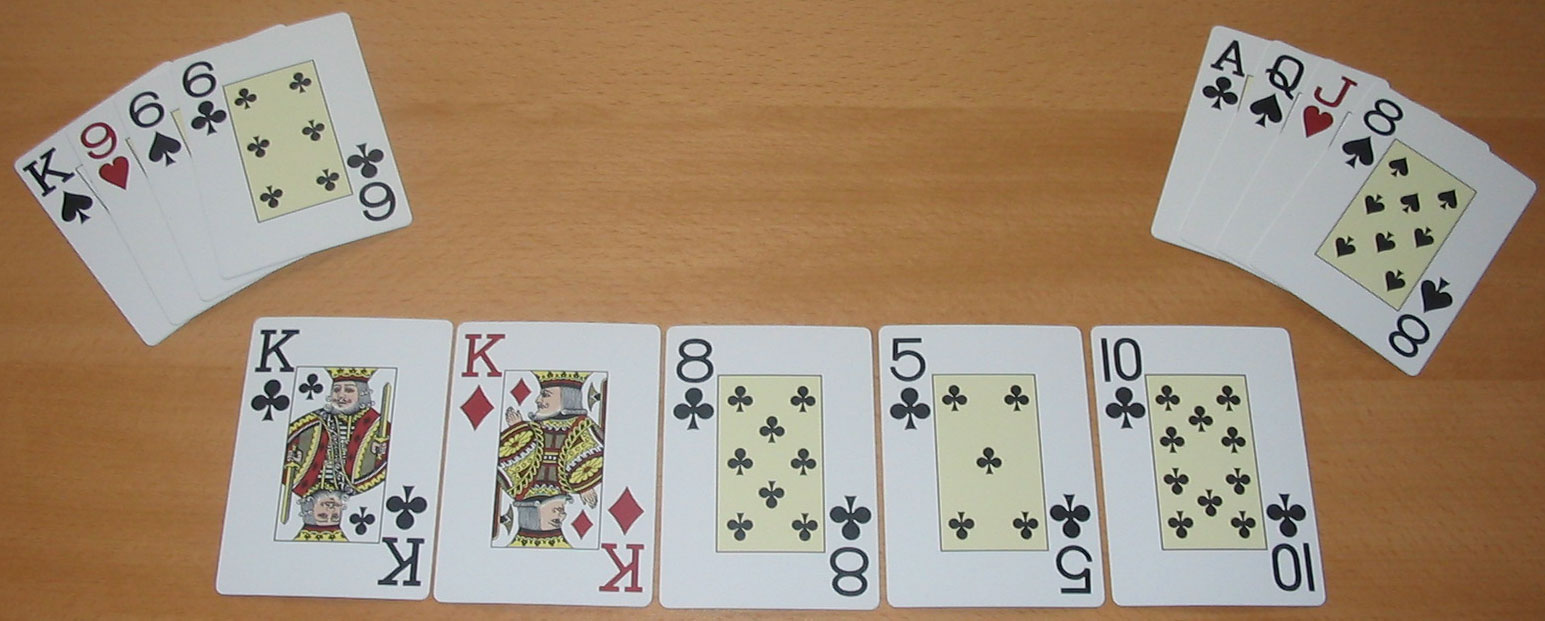
- A showdown in Omaha. The player on the left wins with 3 kings. Unlike Texas Hold'em, Omaha requires exactly 3 community cards to make a hand. The left player has K♣ K♦ K♠ 10♣ 9♥. Right Player has a hand of K♣ K♦ 8♣ 8♠ A♣.
- Alternative names: Omaha
- Type: Community card poker
- Players: 2–11
- Skills: Probability, psychology
- Cards: 52
- Deck: French
- Rank (high→low): A K Q J 10 9 8 7 6 5 4 3 2
- Play: Clockwise
- Chance: Medium to high

Omaha hold 'em (also known as Omaha holdem or simply Omaha) is a community card poker game similar to Texas Hold'em, where each player is dealt four cards and must make their best hand using exactly two of them, plus exactly three of the five community cards. The exact origin of the game is unknown, but casino executive Robert Turner first brought Omaha into a casino setting when he introduced the game to Bill Boyd, who offered it as a game at the Las Vegas Golden Nugget Casino (calling it "Nugget Hold'em"). Omaha uses a 52-card French deck. Omaha hold 'em 8-or-better is the "O" game featured in H.O.R.S.E.

== History ==
Omaha hold 'em derives its name from two types of games.

"Hold'em" refers to a game that uses community cards shared by all players. This contrasts with draw games, where each player's hand consists only of concealed cards, and stud games, where each player's hand contains a mix of visible cards and concealed hole cards.

In the original Omaha poker game, players were dealt only two hole cards and had to use both to make a hand with the community cards. This version of Omaha is defined in the glossary of Super/System (under Omaha) as being interchangeable with "Tight hold 'em". Across all variations of the game, the only consistent rule is that you must use exactly two hole cards. The "Omaha" part of the name represents this aspect of the game.

== Explanation ==
In North American casinos, the term "Omaha" can refer to several poker games. The original game is also commonly known as "Omaha high". A high-low split version, called "Omaha Hi-Lo" (sometimes "Omaha eight-or-better" or "Omaha/8"), is also played. In Europe, "Omaha" still typically refers to the high version of the game, usually played pot-limit. Pot-limit Omaha is often abbreviated as "PLO." Some casinos and online casinos offer pot-limit and no-limit Omaha eight-or-better, though no-limit is rarer.

Omaha is often called a game of "the nuts", i.e., the best possible high or low hand, because it often takes "the nuts" to win a showdown. It is also a game where a player may have draws to multiple hand types between their hand and the community cards. For example, a player may have draws to both a flush and a full house using different combinations of cards. Even seasoned players sometimes need extra time to figure out what draws their hand can make.

The basic differences between Omaha and Texas Hold'em are these: first, each player is dealt four hole cards instead of two. The betting rounds and community card layout are identical. At showdown, each player makes the best five-card hand using exactly three board cards and exactly two of their own cards. Unlike Texas Hold'em, a player cannot use four or five board cards with fewer than two of their own (nor can a player use three or four of their hole cards, which don't exist in Texas Hold'em).

A maximum of eleven players can be dealt a hand in Omaha, regardless of whether burn cards are used; however, Omaha is most commonly played six- or nine-handed.

Some specific things to notice about Omaha hands are:

- As in Texas Hold'em, three or more suited cards on the board make a flush possible, but unlike that game, a player always needs two of that suit in hand to play a flush. For example, with a board of K♠ 9♠ Q♠ Q♥ 5♠, a player with A♠ 2♥ 4♥ 5♣ cannot play a flush using the ace as would be possible in Texas Hold'em; the player must play two cards from in-hand and only three from the board (so instead, this player's best hand is two pair: Q♠ Q♥ 5♠ 5♣ A♠). A player with 2♠ 3♠ K♦ J♦ can play the spade flush.
- The same concept applies to straights. In Omaha, a player cannot use only one hole card and four board cards to make a straight. For example, with a board of 5♠ 6♥ 7♦ 8♥ A♠, a player with J♦ J♠ 4♦ 9♠ or J♦ J♠ 9♦ 9♠ cannot play a straight. But a player with J♦ J♠ 4♦ 3♠ can play a straight from 3 to 7;
- Two pair on the board does not make a full house for anyone with a single matching card as it does in Texas Hold'em. For example, with a board of J♠ J♦ 9♦ 5♥ 9♣, a player with a hand of A♠ 2♠ J♥ K♦ cannot play a full house; the player can only use the A-J to play J♠ J♥ J♦ A♠ 9♣, since they must play three of the board cards. A player with J♣ 2♣ 9♠ 10♠ can use their J-9 to play the full house J♠ J♦ J♣ 9♠ 9♦ (or 9♣). Likewise, a player with 10♠ 5♣ 5♠ 2♣ can use their 5-5 to play the full house J♠ J♦ 5♥ 5♣ 5♠.
- Likewise, with three of a kind on the board, a player must have a pair in hand to make a full house. For example, with a board of J♠ J♦ A♦ J♥ K♣, a player with A♠ 2♠ 3♥ K♦ does not have a full house; the player only has three jacks with an ace-king kicker, and will lose to a player with only a pair of deuces. This is probably the most frequently misread hand in Omaha. (Naturally, a person with the fourth jack in hand can make four jacks because any other card in hand can act as the fifth card, or "kicker".)

== Omaha hi-low split-8 or better ==
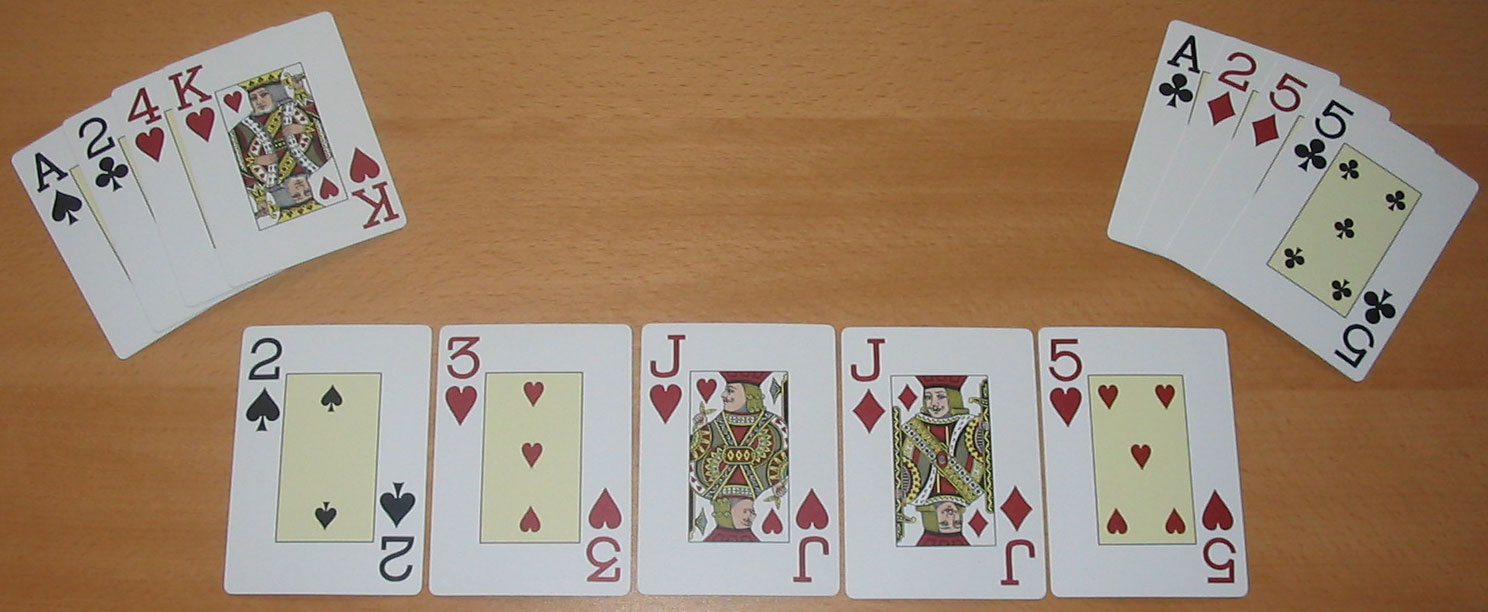
A showdown in Omaha hi-low split. Player on the left wins the low-hand half with the nut low A-2-3-4-5; player on the right wins the high-hand half with a full house 5-5-5-J-J.

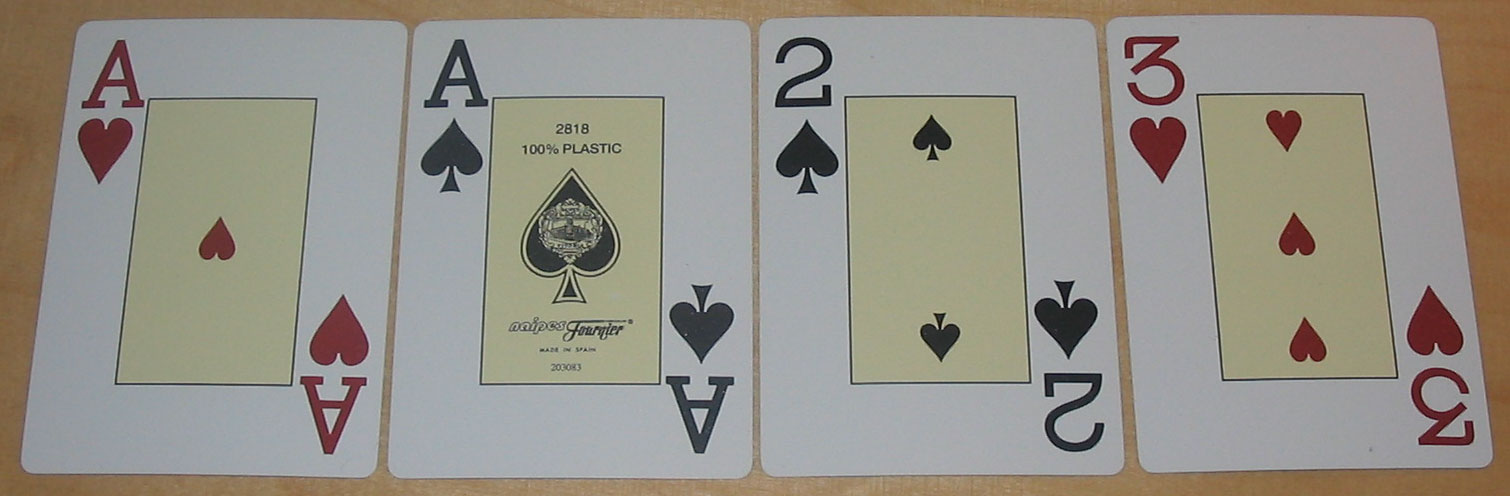
The most valuable starting hand in Omaha hi-low split

In Omaha hi-low split-8 or better (often called Omaha/8), each player makes a separate five-card high hand and five-card ace-to-five low hand (eight-high or lower to qualify), and the pot is split between the high and low (which may be the same player). A few casinos play with a 9-low qualifier instead, but this is rare.

The high hand is played as normal, creating the best hand possible under Omaha rules.

The low hand is created by making the worst hand possible under the rules, using cards 8-7-6-5-4-3-2-A (e.g., "eight or better"). Any combination of cards identified as a "hand", even a lowly pair of twos, is viewed negatively in the low portion.

Players can use different cards for their high and low hands. Each player can use any two of their four hole cards for their high hand and any two for their low hand. If no qualifying low hand exists, the high hand wins (scoops) the whole pot.

The game is usually played in the fixed limit version, although pot limit Omaha/8 is becoming more popular. A few low-stakes online tournaments feature no limit Omaha/8.

The game is complex, so several examples will help clarify play. The table below shows a five-card board at the end of play and each player's initial private four hole cards in the leftmost column. The middle and right columns show each player's best five-card high and low hands at showdown.

Board: 2♠ 5♣ 10♥ 7♦ 8♣
Player	Hand	High	Low
Alan	A♠ 2♥ 5♥ K♣	5♥ 5♣ 2♥ 2♠ 10♥	8♣ 7♦ 5♥ 2♠ A♠
Bryan	A♥ 3♥ 10♠ 10♣	10♠ 10♣ 10♥ 8♣ 7♦	7♦ 5♣ 3♥ 2♠ A♥
Chris	7♣ 9♣ J♠ Q♠	J♠ 10♥ 9♣ 8♣ 7♦	Cannot qualify (not enough 8 or below cards)
Derek	4♥ 7♥ K♠ K♦	K♠ K♦ 10♥ 8♣ 7♦	8♣ 7♥ 5♣ 4♥ 2♠
Eve	A♦ 3♦ 6♦ 9♥	10♥ 9♥ 8♣ 7♦ 6♦	7♦ 5♣ 3♦ 2♠ A♦

Chris wins the high-hand half of the pot with a J-high straight.

Bryan and Eve split the low hand pot with 7-5-3-2-A, a junk hand. Both Alan (a pair of twos) and Derek (a pair of sevens) lose because their hands are low in value but still beat Bryan and Eve's junk hands. Had Bryan and Eve had hands (a pair of threes, for example), then Alan would have won with the least valuable hand, a lowly pair of deuces.

Some specific things to notice about Omaha/8 hands are:

- In order for anyone to qualify low, there must be at least three cards of differing ranks 8 or below on the board. For example, a board of K-8-J-7-5 makes low possible (the best low hand would be A-2, followed by A-3, 2-3, etc.) A board of K-8-J-8-5, however, cannot make any qualifying low (the best low hand possible would be J-8-5-2-A, which does not qualify). Statistically, a low hand is possible about 60% of the time.
- Low hands often tie, and high straights occasionally tie as well, as do, even more rarely, full houses. In theory, you can win as little as 1/14 of a pot (though this is extraordinarily rare). Winning a quarter of the pot is quite common, and is called "getting quartered." One dangerous aspect of playing for the low pot is the concept of "counterfeiting". For example, if a player has 2-3 and two other cards in their hand and the flop is A-6-7, that player has flopped the "nut low". However, if either a 2 or a 3 hits the board on the turn or the river, the hand is "counterfeited", and the nut low hand is lost (the player still has a much weaker low hand, however, with 3-4, 3-5 and 4-5 making better lows). This is why the "protected" nut low has significant extra value. To illustrate this, if the player has 2-3-4 in their hand, their low is protected; i.e., if a 2 or 3 hits the board, they still have the lowest possible hand. To lose the nut low in this case, either a 2 and a 3, a 2 and a 4, or a 3 and a 4 would have to hit the board on the turn and the river (giving the nut low to a player holding 4-5, 3-5 and 2-5, respectively), an unlikely possibility. For similar reasons, the protected nut low draw is significantly better than the low draw. For example, you could have A-2-3 with a flop of 7-8-9; any low card below 7 on the turn or river gives you the best low.
- When four or five low cards appear on the board, it can become very difficult to read the low hands properly. For example, with a board of 2♦ 6♥ A♣ 5♣ 8♠, the hand 2♥ 4♠ 5♠ K♦ is playing a 6-5-4-2-A (either their 2-4 with the board's A-5-6, or their 4-5 with the board's A-2-6--either way makes the same hand). In this situation, he is often said to be playing his "live" 4, that is, his 4, plus some other low card that matches the board but still makes a low because the board card isn't needed. A player with 3♠ 5♠ 10♥ J♦ is playing a "live" 3, for a low of 6-5-3-2-A, which makes a better low. However, a player with 3♣ 7♦ Q♦ Q♠ can only play 7-5-3-2-A low; even though he has a "live" 3, he must play two low cards from their hand, and so he must play their 7-3, and cannot make a 6-high low hand.
- Starting hands with three or four cards of one rank are very bad. In fact, the worst possible hand in the game is 2♠ 2♣ 2♥ 2♦. Since the only possible two-card combination in this hand is 2-2, you can't make low. With no deuce left to appear on the board, you can't make three deuces or deuces full, and anyone with a matching card on the board will make a higher pair. Likewise, starting with four cards of one suit makes it less likely you can make a flush. Starting with four different suits gives you no chance of a flush, and starting with four disconnected cards reduces your straight possibilities. Computer analysis of the best starting hands has proven that the best starting hand for Omaha is A-A-K-K (double suited). One favorite starting hand for Omaha is A-A-J-10 (double suited) because it offers a wider range of nut straights (J-7, Q-8, K-9, and A-10). For the Hi-Lo variation, the most valuable starting holding is A-A-2-3 (double suited).
- Hands to avoid tend to contain mainly middle-ranked cards, which are of little use for any low splits and which tend to generate lower pairs and sets, weaker flushes and lower straights and can be very expensive. Four of a kind is the worst possible starting hand in Omaha, unlike in most other poker games, where it is exceptionally strong.
- Straights and flushes are ignored when judging low hands. Low hand ranks from best to worst: 5-4-3-2-A (the wheel), 6-4-3-2-A, 6-5-3-2-A, 6-5-4-2-A, ..., 8-7-6-5-4. Low hands can thus be read as numbers between 54,321 and 87,654 (except for any number with a pair, i.e., 54,322). The lowest number that any player can make, when ordered from high card to low, is the best possible low hand in play. For example: 2♠ 3♣ 5♥ 6♥ 7♥ wins over A♠ 2♣ 3♥ 4♣ 8♠

== Pot-limit Omaha ==
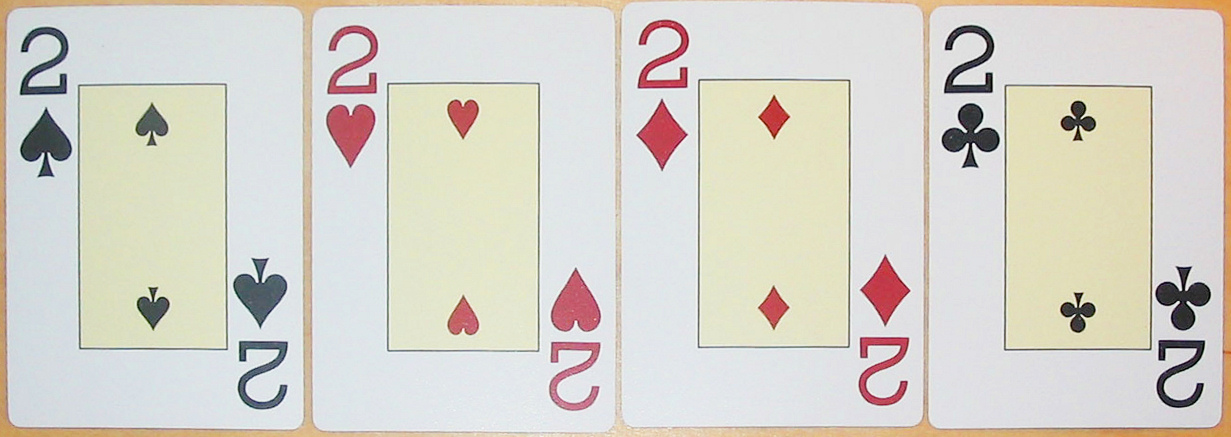
The worst starting hand in Omaha

Pot-limit Omaha (frequently shortened to PLO) is popular in Europe, online, and in high-stakes "mixed games" played in some American casinos. This variant is more often played high only, but can also be played high-low. More than Limit Omaha Hi-Lo, PLO is a draw game in which players draw to the nut hand. Second best flushes and straights can be, and frequently become, losing hands, especially when a player is willing to commit their entire stack to the pot. Furthermore, because pot size grows exponentially in pot-limit play, seeing one of these hands to the end can be very expensive and carry immense reverse implied odds.

=== Wraps ===
In poker, an out is any unseen card in the deck that will give a player the best hand. A wrap is a straight draw with nine or more outs. This is called a wrap because the player's hole cards are said to "wrap around" the board cards. In Texas Hold'em, where players have two hole cards, the most straight outs possible is eight; however, in Omaha, with four hole cards, straight draws can have up to 20 outs. An example of a twenty-out wrap is J♥ 10♠ 7♦ 6♣ on a flop of 9♥ 8♠ 2♦. To hit a straight, any of the following cards is needed: 5♥ 5♠ 5♦ 5♣ 6♥ 6♠ 6♦ 7♥ 7♠ 7♣ 10♥ 10♦ 10♣ J♠ J♦ J♣ Q♥ Q♠ Q♦ Q♣.

=== Redraws ===
A desirable hand to have in PLO is the current best hand with a redraw to the nuts. For example, if the board is Q♠ J♠ 10♥, and the player has A♠ K♣ Q♣ Q♥, then not only do they have the current best hand possible (their ace-king makes the ace-high straight), but they also have a redraw with the two queens in their hand because if the board pairs, they will make a full house or four queens. A♠ K♠ Q♣ Q♥ would be an even better hand because it also has flush and royal flush redraws. In fact, with the Q♠ J♠ 10♥ board, A♠ K♠ Q♣ Q♥ is approximately an 80–20 money favorite over a random hand containing ace-king (see freerolling). Even a pair of queens with any two spades beats 55–45% of random ace-king hands.

== Omaha variations ==
The most common variations of Pot Limit Omaha high are Five-card Omaha, commonly referred to as "Big O", very popular in the Southeastern United States as a home game, and Six-card Omaha or 6-O, which can be found in many casinos across the UK. Some online poker rooms support Five-card Omaha, Six-card Omaha and Courchevel.

"Big O" (occasionally called Five-card Omaha or 5-O) began appearing in Southern California in 2008 and spread to most card rooms in the area by the end of the year.

Sometimes players use a 9 or 7-high qualifier instead of 8-high. You can also play it with five cards dealt to each player instead of four. In that case, the same hand-making rules apply: exactly two from the player's hand and exactly three from the board.

=== Courchevel ===
Courchevel is named after the high-end ski resort in the French Alps. According to urban legend, bored tourists wanted to play a version of poker no one had ever played before, so they came up with the game. People most commonly played Courchevel at the Aviation Club de France. That casino is now closed.

In the game of Courchevel, players are dealt five hole cards rather than four. The first community card is dealt at the same time. After an opening round of betting, two additional community cards are dealt, creating a 3-card flop, after which the game structure is identical to standard Omaha. Players must still use exactly two of their five hole cards. Courchevel is popular in France, but it has spread to other parts of Europe, particularly the United Kingdom. Courchevel is also available in a hi-low 8 or better variety, and while Courchevel is rarely offered on any of the major online poker sites, as of 2019, hi-low sit-and-go games at the micro stakes level can be found taking place several times a day on PokerStars, which had the game since 2013.

== See also ==
- Glossary of poker terms
- List of poker hands
- Texas hold'em
- Greek hold 'em
