= The Biggest Game in Town =

1983 book by Al Alvarez

- First edition (UK)
- Author: Alfred Alvarez
- Publisher: Andre Deutsch (UK); Houghton Mifflin (US)
- Publication date: 1983
- ISBN: 978-0-395-33964-0

In 1983, Al Alvarez published, The Biggest Game in Town, a book detailing the 1981 World Series of Poker event. The first book of its kind, it described the world of professional poker players and the World Series of Poker. It is credited with beginning the genre of poker literature and with bringing Texas Hold'em (and poker generally), for the first time, to a wider audience.

Alvarez, best known as a poet and literary critic, first became interested in poker after reading Herbert O. Yardley's The Education of a Poker Player when it was first published in 1957. In 2001 he produced an illustrated coffee table book on the same subject: Poker: Bets, Bluffs & Bad Beats.

== Reviews ==
- Games #42
- Andrew Ryan. 'Chips with Everything', Slightly Foxed, Issue 90 (Summer 2026)
