= The Professor, the Banker, and the Suicide King =

2005 book by Michael Craig

The Professor, The Banker, and The Suicide King
- First edition
- Author: Michael Craig
- Language: English
- Genre: Poker, Gambling
- Publisher: Warner Books
- Publication date: 2005
- Publication place: United States
- Pages: 282 pages (Paperback edition)
- ISBN: 0-446-57769-3 (Paperback edition)
- OCLC: 57316628
- Dewey Decimal: 795.412 22
- LC Class: GV1254 .C73 2005

The Professor, the Banker, and the Suicide King: Inside the Richest Poker Game of All Time is a 2005 book by Michael Craig detailing billionaire Andrew Beal's series of high-stakes poker games with Las Vegas' top professional poker players. The book title refers to some of the professional players involved in this series. The Professor is Howard Lederer, the Banker is Andrew Beal, and the Suicide King is Ted Forrest. It also refers to the King of Hearts, since on the card the King's sword appears to be put in his head.

== Plot summary ==
The book describes a series of high-stakes poker matches played over several years between Andrew Beal and a group of professional players known as "The Corporation". The group included Ted Forrest, Jennifer Harman, Minh Ly, Doyle Brunson, Todd Brunson, Howard Lederer, David Grey, Chip Reese, Gus Hansen, Phil Ivey, Barry Greenstein, Lyle Berman and others. Many of them kept their identities anonymous, or were part of the group at different points.

Ted Forrest, a professional poker player, contacted the Bellagio poker room and was informed that the highest stakes were $10,000–$20,000. He joined the game with $500,000 and played against Chip Reese and Andrew Beal. Forrest had lost $400,000 without playing a single hand, and questioned why he was there.

Beal first visited the Bellagio poker room in February 2001, where he met professional players, including Todd Brunson, and won over $100,000, which he attributed to luck.

He returned to Las Vegas and played heads-up with professionals for the highest stakes. Top professional poker players decided to pool their money with everybody who they thought could play the game against Beal. Beal began his match with Chip Reese, then Ted Forrest sat down. Down to his last $100,000 Forrest makes a comeback and wins $1.5 million. He is then asked to join the group and nobody else sits down besides Beal and his selected opponent, who alternates.

The matches continued for three years, with the now-wealthy Beal winning most of the contests and eventually flying back to Texas with over $10 million of The corporation's money. Late in the series, The corporation was forced to have all of its members add money to the collective bankroll in order to continue the match. In March 2004, Beal announced he was finished with poker for good after losing $16 million in two days, primarily to The corporation's newest star player Phil Ivey.

== Post 2004 ==
For two years Beal keeps his vow to quit poker, but returns to high-stakes poker in 2006. These later matches were described online by Craig for Bluff magazine.

Al Alvarez reviewed the book believing Andy Beal played for too long and Stu Ungar, who died in 1998, was connected to the Mafia.
