= Brick Towers =

Former 324-unit affordable housing development in Newark, New Jersey, US

Coordinates: 40.7286°N 74.18256°W

Brick Towers was a 324-unit affordable housing development in Newark, New Jersey, originally occupied in 1970. The buildings were demolished in 2008, despite opposition by the City's Mayor Cory Booker, who was living in the property at the time. Although the buildings were reported structurally sound, there were persistent problems with poor management and associated criminal activity. The site has been redeveloped.

== See also ==
- List of tallest buildings in Newark
- 440 Elizabeth Avenue
