= Big Deal: A Year as a Professional Poker Player =

1992 book by Anthony Holden

Big Deal:A Year as a Professional Poker Player
- Author: Anthony Holden
- Language: English
- Subject: Poker
- Genre: Non-fiction
- Publication date: 1992
- ISBN: 0-7432-9481-5
- OCLC: 85692821
- LC Class: GV1251 .H65 2007
- Followed by: Bigger Deal: A Year Inside the Poker Boom

Big Deal: A Year as a Professional Poker Player is a book by Anthony Holden. The book details a year Holden spent playing poker around the world, attempting to make a living, or at least a profit, from the endeavour. The book covers one year from the 1988 World Series of Poker, where Holden enters unplanned, through to the 1989 World Series of Poker, documenting his progress in other tournaments in Morocco, Malta, Las Vegas and aboard a ship in the Caribbean in the process.

In the book, Holden details his experiences with the gamesmanship of poker, the characters of the professional poker scene, his own psyche and that of the professional gambler, and the importance of his casual 'Tuesday Night Game' in his life, which he played with Al Alvarez and other friends. An incident where a professional poker player cited the book as the impetus to become a pro serves as the book's foreword in later editions.

Holden has written a sequel, Bigger Deal: A Year Inside the Poker Boom, again detailing his experiences in the World Series of Poker, this time in the wake of the explosion of poker's popularity in the early-mid 2000s.
