= Bigger Deal =

2007 book by Anthony Holden

Bigger Deal: A Year Inside the Poker Boom
- First UK edition)
- Author: Anthony Holden
- Illustrator: Gerald Scarfe UK edition US edition is unillustrated)
- Cover artist: Gerald Scarfe (UK); Ed Honowitz (US)
- Language: English
- Subject: Poker
- Genre: Non-fiction
- Publisher: Little, Brown and Company (UK); Simon & Schuster (US)
- Publication date: May 2, 2007
- Publication place: England and United States
- Media type: Hardcover
- Pages: 291 (American edition)
- ISBN: 0-7432-9482-3
- Dewey Decimal: 795.412092 B 22
- LC Class: GV1250.2.H65 A3 2007
- Preceded by: Big Deal

Bigger Deal: A Year Inside the Poker Boom is Anthony Holden's follow-up to his 1990 book Big Deal: A Year as a Professional Poker Player. The book follows Holden's return to professional poker fifteen years after his last adventure ended. The book begins with the WSOP 2005, following him around the world to eventually return to Las Vegas for the WSOP 2006.

The main thrust of the book is the changes that poker has undergone since the game became immensely popular following the 2003 World Series of Poker and the advent of Internet casinos and cardrooms. When Holden played in the 1988 World Series of Poker, there were only 167 starters competing for a first prize of $270,000. At the 2006 World Series, where this book climaxes, there were almost nine thousand players and a first prize of $12 million, the richest in any sport.
