= Mo Anthoine =

British mountain climber

Julian Vincent "Mo" Anthoine (1 August 1939 – 12 August 1989) was a British mountaineer who climbed extensively in the Himalayas in the 1970s and 80s.

== Early life ==
Born in Kidderminster, he left King Charles I School at the age of sixteen to become a trainee manager in the carpet industry. It was on an Outward Bound course as part of his management training that he had his first climbing experience, and soon afterward he left the carpet industry to take a job at the Ogwen Cottage Outdoor Pursuits Centre in Snowdonia. He travelled widely in his early 20s, hitchhiking across Europe, Asia, and Australia from 1961 to 1963, paying his way by working in an asbestos mine in Australia and smuggling turquoise into Pakistan. On his return to Britain, he had a spell training and working as a teacher in England, before settling in North Wales in 1968 and starting a business, "Snowdon Mouldings", manufacturing climbing helmets.

== Climbing career ==
Anthoine might have remained a relatively unknown figure outside climbing circles but for his friendship with the writer and occasional climber Al Alvarez. He probably saved Alvarez's life in the Dolomites in 1964. Climbing the 600-metre north face of Cima Grande di Lavaredo, the pair were caught by a snowstorm on the overhanging wall and forced to spend a night on a small ledge with wet clothes in freezing conditions. Alvarez was convinced that they would freeze to death, but Anthoine remained calm and kept the pair's spirits up, pummelling Alvarez all night to keep him awake and keep his circulation going. In the event, both men survived with mild frostbite. Alvarez wrote a fictionalized account of the incident for The New Yorker in 1971, followed by a full-length biography of Anthoine in 1988. The book's title, Feeding the Rat, derived from Anthoine's characterisation of his need for adventure as a rat that gnawed away at him.

Anthoine was a good technical rock climber and made a number of first ascents in North Wales, the best known of which was The Groove on Llech Ddu, a crag on the north side of Carnedd Dafydd. However, it was for his mountaineering and alpine climbing that he is best remembered. In the Alps, he was involved in a six-day struggle through a storm near the summit of Mont Blanc, which killed seven climbers, cajoling others to survive.

In the 1970s and 1980s, Anthoine took part in a number of Himalayan expeditions. In 1976, he made the first ascent of Trango Tower with Joe Brown. Two years later, on an expedition to The Ogre, he and Clive Rowland saved the lives of Doug Scott (who had broken both legs) and Chris Bonington (who had broken several ribs), on a grueling seven-day descent from close to the top of the mountain. The incident attracted considerable media attention, but Anthoine, a modest man, was content to remain in the background and take little credit.

Anthoine was known as a cautious climber who valued safety, travel, and the companionship of friends more than the summit. He was sometimes criticised for over-caution, but simply responded that "no mountain is worth a mate", and in more than twenty years of expeditions, no members of his teams were ever killed.

His last expedition was a 1988 attempt on Mount Everest led by Brummie Stokes, which failed to reach the summit but did establish a new route on the North East Ridge as far as the junction with the North Ridge. He died the following year of a brain tumour at his home in Nant Peris.
