= Community card poker =

Any game of poker that uses community cards

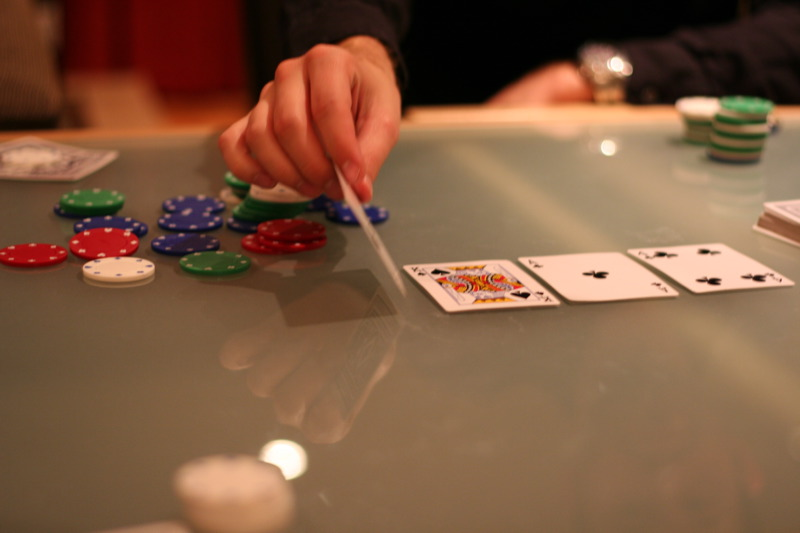
Texas hold 'em deals community cards

Community card poker is any game of poker that uses community cards (also called "shared cards"), which are cards dealt face up in the center of the table and shared by all players. In these games, each player is dealt an incomplete hand face down ("hole cards"), which are then combined with the community cards to make a complete hand. The set of community cards is called the "board", and may be dealt in a simple line or arranged in a special pattern. Rules of each game determine how they may be combined with each player's private hand. The most popular community card game today is Texas hold 'em, originating sometime in the 1920s.

In home games, it is typical to use antes, while casinos typically use only blinds for these games. No limit and fixed limit games are most common, while spread limit and pot limit games are less common. The betting format and stakes can vary by region as well as time of year and volume (casinos often change games on weekends to accommodate increased customer demand). Later betting rounds often have a higher limit than earlier betting rounds. Each betting round begins with the player to the dealer's left (when blinds are used, the first round begins with the player after the big blind), so community card games are generally positional games.

Most community card games do not play well with lowball hand values, though some do play very well at high-low split, especially with ace-to-five low values, making it possible to win both halves of a pot. When played high-low split, there is generally a minimum qualifying hand for low (often 8-high) and no declaration is needed.

== Community cards ==
Often, several community cards are dealt to the table, shared by all players, and subject to variant-specific rules about how many, and which of the cards may be used in each player's hand. Such a set of community cards is often called a "board". The board is usually dealt in a simple line, but some games may have elaborate layouts of community cards with special rules about what combinations can be used. For example, Texas hold 'em ends with each player holding two cards in his individual hand, and a board of five community cards in a simple line shared by everyone; each player then plays the best five-card hand in any combination. In Omaha hold 'em, game rules restrict players to using exactly three (no more and no fewer) of the five community cards, combined with exactly two of the four cards dealt to each player, to make a hand. In Tic-tac-toe, the board is a 3x3 array of nine cards, and players must use exactly three cards from a row, column, or diagonal of the board.

== Texas hold 'em ==
This is the most popular community card game today. Each player is dealt two private "hole" cards, after which there is a betting round. Then three community cards are dealt face up (in no particular order or pattern) to form the "flop", followed by a second betting round. A fourth community card (the "turn") is followed by a third betting round. And finally the fifth community card (the "river") is followed by the final betting round. At showdown, each player plays the best five-card hand he can make using any five cards among the two in his hand and the five on the board. This is the key difference from Omaha hold 'em; the player may use both, one, or none of his hole cards in the final hand (though a hand that plays the board is guaranteed to be able to "chop" the pot at best, since every other player still in the hand at showdown has access to those same five cards). Note that in current practice, before each community card round (the flop, the turn, and the river) first a card is "burned" and placed in a discard pile. This was implemented to prevent card-cheaters from "marking" cards and knowing what the card on the top of the dealer's deck was.

=== Double-board hold 'em ===
For double-board hold 'em, two separate five-card boards are dealt, and the high hand using each board takes half of the pot. For example, after the first betting round, three community cards are dealt to each of two separate boards; after the second round, another community card is dealt to each board; and before the final round, a fifth community card is dealt to each board (so there will be in total ten community cards, comprising two separate five-card hold 'em boards). It is possible for one player to have the best hand on both boards and thus "scoop" the entire pot.

This variant of Texas hold 'em is sometimes called "double-flop hold 'em", which is a bit of a misnomer, since there are not just two flops, but also two turns and two rivers.

=== Greek hold 'em ===
Greek hold 'em follows the same rules as Omaha, except that each player is only dealt two cards, same as in Texas hold 'em. In Greek hold 'em each player must use both hole cards along with 3 of the total available community cards to make the strongest five card hand, unlike Texas hold 'em where each player may play the best five card poker hand from any combination of the seven cards available to them.

=== Irish Poker ===
In Irish poker, each player is dealt four cards before the flop. After the betting round on the flop is completed each player must discard two cards. From this point the game is played exactly like Texas hold 'em with betting after the turn and river. At showdown, each player uses their remaining two cards along with the board to construct a hand.

=== No river hold 'em ===
Players are dealt three hole cards instead of two with three betting rounds: pre-flop, flop and turn. Players can use any number of hole cards to make the final hand.

=== Royal hold 'em ===
Royal hold 'em is a variation which is played using a stripped deck. In royal hold'em, the deuces through nines are stripped from the deck, thereby only leaving the tens through aces.

Royal hold 'em can only be played with a maximum of six players because there are only 20 cards in the deck. With 5 community cards, 3 burn cards, and 2 pocket cards per player, a six-player table will use all 20 cards in the deck. The strategy for royal hold 'em varies from other forms of poker, since the odds of certain hands are greatly increased.

=== Six-plus hold 'em ===
Six-plus hold 'em, also known as short-deck hold 'em, is a variation in which the cards valued 2 through 5 are removed from the deck.

== Omaha hold 'em ==
Another hold 'em variant is Omaha hold 'em. Each player is dealt four cards to his private hand instead of two. The betting rounds and layout of community cards is identical to Texas hold 'em. At showdown, each player's hand is the best five-card hand he can make from exactly three of the five cards on the board, plus exactly two of his own cards.

The high-low split version of Omaha is called many different names, such as "Omaha Eight or better", "Omaha HiLo" or "Omaha8". Each player, using the above rules, makes a separate five-card high hand and five-card low hand, and the pot is split between the high and low (which may be the same player). To qualify for low, a player must be able to play an 8-7-6-5-4 or lower. A few casinos play with a 9-low qualifier instead, but this is rare. In high-low split games, aces count as both high and low.

The low hand is unavailable if the board cards do not include cards of at least three different ranks of 8 or lower (with aces counting as low). Paired cards lower than eight don't qualify.

When high hands only are used, the game is generally called "Omaha high" to avoid ambiguity.

Omaha can be played fixed limit, pot limit (where it is often called "PLO") or no limit. It is sometimes played where each player gets five cards instead of four. The same rules apply for showdown: each player must use two of his cards with three of the community cards.

=== Courchevel ===
A variant of Omaha hold 'em (5-Card Omaha) very popular in Europe, where instead of betting on the initial four cards and then flopping three community cards for the second round, the first community card is dealt before the first betting round, so that each player has five private cards and a single community card on his first round of betting. Then two more community cards are dealt to complete the Flop, and then play proceeds exactly as in Omaha.

== Pineapple variations ==
Players are initially dealt three cards. Each player then discards one of the three cards (Pre-flop, Post-flop or at Showdown), and the game proceeds exactly as in Texas hold 'em. In some regional variations, five cards are dealt, and one is discarded after flop, turn, and river, otherwise proceeding as usual Texas hold 'em.

=== Pineapple ===
Players discard their third (unwanted or unneeded) card pre-flop, before the first betting round.

=== Crazy Pineapple ===
Players discard their third (unwanted or unneeded) card after the flop, before the fourth community card is dealt.

=== Tahoe (Lazy Pineapple) ===
Players discard after the final betting round or at showdown so they may not use all three of them to make a hand. Each player may use none, one, or two cards from their hand (never three cards) combined with those on the board, to make their final five-card hand, just like in Texas hold 'em.

In the variant known as "Super hold 'em", players can keep all 3 private cards throughout the play and may use all three cards to determine high hand.

== Manila ==
Manila is played with a stripped deck in which all cards below the rank of 7 are removed (leaving 32 cards). Each player is dealt two private cards, and a single community card is dealt face up, followed by the first betting round. Then a second community card is followed by a second betting round, a third community card and a third betting round, a fourth community card and a fourth betting round, and finally a fifth community card and fifth betting round. On showdown, unlike Texas hold 'em (and more like Omaha), each player makes the best hand possible from both of their own hole cards with exactly three of the five community cards.

Because of the stripped deck, a flush beats a full house. Also, an ace may not be played low for a straight (that is, the hand A-7-8-9-10 is not a straight in Manila). Manila and its variants are rarely played high-low split (in fact, very few stripped deck games are ever played low).

Common variations involve dealing three cards to each player, one of which can either be discarded at some point (like Pineapple, above), or else held to the end, but maintaining the requirement that players play exactly two of their own cards with exactly three of the board. The three-card variant is sometimes played with 6s being restored to the deck, making it 36 cards.

=== Pinatubo ===
Because Manila has five betting rounds, it does not play well at no limit or pot limit. This can be easily modified by eliminating the betting round between the second and third community cards. So, each player is dealt two private cards and a single community card is dealt to the board, followed by the first betting round. Then two community cards are dealt, followed by a second betting round. Then a fourth community card and third betting round, a fifth and final community card and fourth betting round, followed by a showdown as above.

The three-card variant can be played this way as well (as with Manila, the players must use exactly two of their three-hole cards with three of the board cards to make a hand).

=== Crazy Canadian Poker ===
In this variant of Texas hold 'em. Players are each dealt two hole cards, after which there is a first round of betting. This is followed by 3 face up cards (or the flop) with another round of betting. A fourth face up community card (the turn) is then placed face up. This card is wild as are any other cards of the same number or face card, both in the community cards or in a player's pocket. After this card is played a third round of betting takes place. The last card (or river) is then played with final bets made.

== See also ==
- List of poker variants
