= Bill Boyd (poker player) =

American poker player (1906–1997)

- Nickname: None
- Born: January 27, 1906
- Died: November 21, 1997 (aged 91)

World Series of Poker
- Bracelets: 4
- Money finishes: 4
- Highest WSOP Main Event finish: None

William Walter Boyd (January 27, 1906 – November 21, 1997) was a professional poker player.

Boyd was a five-card stud player; he won all four of his World Series of Poker bracelets in five-card stud. Boyd, Doyle Brunson and Loren Klein are the only players in WSOP history to have won bracelets in four consecutive years. For a short time, Boyd led all poker players in career WSOP bracelets with four until Johnny Moss tied him in the 1974 WSOP Main EVent.

Additionally, Boyd is responsible for the spread of Omaha hold 'em. In 1983, Robert "Chip Burner" Turner approached Boyd, who was then the director of operations at the Golden Nugget casino in Las Vegas, Nevada. The game, being previously unnamed, was called Nugget hold 'em. Sometime later, it was renamed to its current name of "Omaha".

Boyd managed the card room at the Golden Nugget from the day it opened in 1946 until its closing in 1988.

As a tribute to his long career, he was dealt the first poker hand ever at the Mirage. He was elected to the Poker Hall of Fame in 1981.

Boyd died in Las Vegas on November 21, 1997, at the age of 91.

== World Series of Poker Bracelets ==
| Year | Tournament | Prize |
|---|---|---|
| 1971 | $1,000 No-Limit Five-Card Stud | $10,000 |
| 1972 | $10,000 No-Limit Five-Card Stud | $20,000 |
| 1973 | $10,000 No-Limit Five-Card Stud | $10,000 |
| 1974 | $5,000 No-Limit Five-Card Stud | $40,000 |
