= Al Alvarez =

English poet, novelist, essayist, and critic (1929–2019)

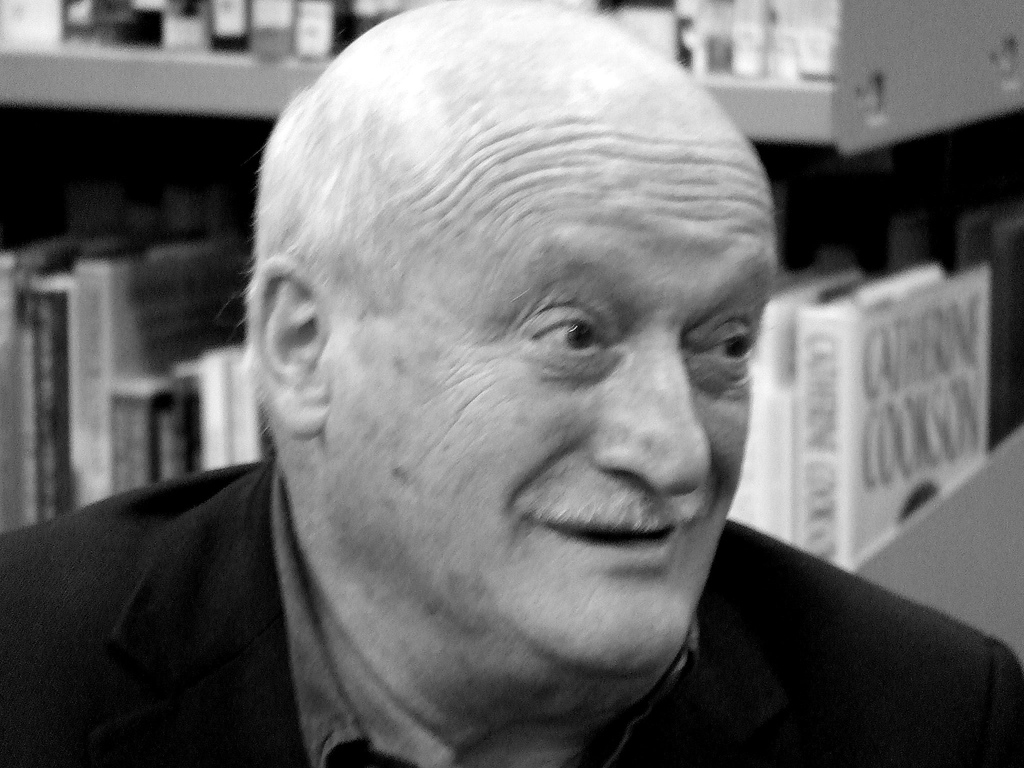
- Alvarez in 2006
- Born: 5 August 1929; London, England
- Died: 23 September 2019 (aged 90)
- Occupations: Poet; author; critic
- Writing career
- Period: 1956–2019

Alfred Alvarez (5 August 1929 – 23 September 2019) was an English poet, novelist, essayist and critic who published under the name A. Alvarez and Al Alvarez.

== Background ==
Alfred Alvarez was born in London, to an Ashkenazic Jewish mother and a father from a Sephardic Jewish family. He was educated at The Hall School in Hampstead, London, and then Oundle School and Corpus Christi College, Oxford, where he took a First in English. He was subsequently elected as a Jane Eliza Procter Visiting Fellow at Princeton University. After teaching briefly in Oxford and the United States, he became a full-time writer in his late twenties. From 1956 to 1966, he was the poetry editor and critic for The Observer, where he introduced British readers to John Berryman, Robert Lowell, Sylvia Plath, Zbigniew Herbert, and Miroslav Holub.

Alvarez was the author of many non-fiction books. His renowned study of suicide, The Savage God, gained added resonance from his friendship with Plath. He also wrote on divorce (Life After Marriage), dreams (Night), and the oil industry (Offshore), as well as his hobbies of poker (The Biggest Game In Town) and mountaineering (Feeding the Rat, a profile of his frequent climbing partner Mo Anthoine). His 1999 autobiography is entitled Where Did It All Go Right?

His 1962 poetry anthology The New Poetry was hailed at the time as a fresh departure. It championed the American style, in relation to the perceived excessive 'gentility' of British poetry of the time. In 2010, he was awarded the Benson Medal by the Royal Society of Literature.

== Film and TV ==
In July 1989 Alvarez made an extended appearance on the Channel 4 discussion programme After Dark to discuss gambling alongside, among others, Victor Lownes and David Berglas. Alvarez was portrayed by Jared Harris in the 2003 film Sylvia, which chronicles the troubled relationship between Plath and her husband Ted Hughes.

== Death ==
He died at the age of 90 from viral pneumonia. He is buried in Hampstead Cemetery.

== Legacy ==
In 1990 the British Library acquired Alvarez's archive consisting of correspondence, and papers relating to his poetry, prose publications and scripts for stage, film, radio and television.

== Selected works ==
- The Shaping Spirit (1958)
- The School of Donne (1961)
- The New Poetry (1962)
- Under Pressure (1965)
- Beyond All This Fiddle (1968)
- The Savage God (1972)
- Beckett (Fontana Modern Masters, 1973)
- Hers (1974)
- Hunt (1979)
- Life After Marriage (1982)
- The Biggest Game in Town (1983)
- Feeding the Rat (1988)
- Day of Atonement (1991)
- Night (1995)
- Where Did It All Go Right? (1999)
- Poker: Bets, Bluffs, and Bad Beats (2001)
- New & Selected Poems (2002)
- The Writer's Voice (2005)
- Risky Business (2007)
- Pondlife (2013)

== See also ==
- Confessional poetry
