= Alexander Teixeira de Mattos =

Dutch-English journalist, literary critic and publisher

- Portrait of Teixeira de Mattos by E. O. Hoppé
- Born: Alexander Louis Teixeira de Mattos; 9 April 1865; Amsterdam, Netherlands
- Died: 5 December 1921 (aged 56); St Ives, Cornwall, England
- Occupations: Journalist, critic, publisher, professional translator
- Known for: Translations

Signature
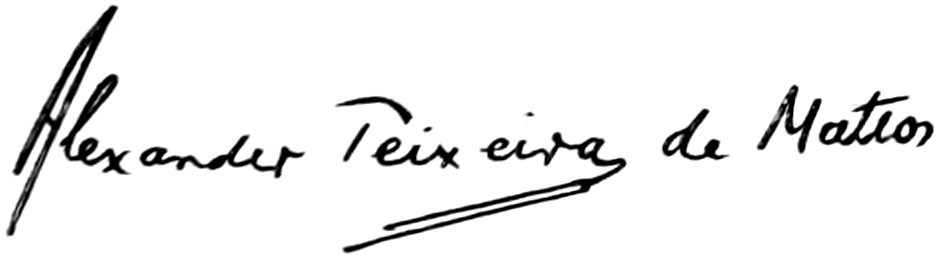

Alexander Louis Teixeira de Mattos (9 April 1865 – 5 December 1921), known as Alexander Teixeira de Mattos, was a Dutch-English journalist, literary critic and publisher, who gained his greatest fame as a translator.

== Early life ==
The Teixeira de Mattos Sampaio e Mendes family was of Portuguese Jewish origin, having been driven out of Portugal to the Netherlands by Holy Office persecution. Alexander Teixeira de Mattos was born as a Dutch Protestant to an English mother and a Dutch father. In 1874, when he was nine years old, he and his family moved from Amsterdam to England. There, he studied under Monsignor Thomas John Capel and converted to Roman Catholicism. He then studied at the Kensington Catholic Public School and at the Jesuit school Beaumont College.

== Career ==
After his studies, Teixeira came into contact with J. T. Grein, a London impresario of Dutch origin, and was made secretary of Grein's Independent Theatre Society. He worked as a freelance translator, as the London correspondent of a Dutch newspaper, and as the editor of the papers Dramatic Opinions and The Candid Friend, and, in collaboration with Leonard Smithers, in publishing. He became the official translator of the works of Maurice Maeterlinck, beginning with Maeterlinck's The Double Garden.

Teixera was fluent in English, French, German, Flemish, Dutch, and Danish. In addition to the later works of Maeterlinck, his translations include works by Émile Zola, Alexis de Tocqueville, Maurice Leblanc, Gaston Leroux, François-René de Chateaubriand, Paul Kruger, Carl Ewald, Georgette Leblanc, Stijn Streuvels, and Louis Couperus. He considered his greatest achievement to be his complete translation of Jean-Henri Fabre's natural history.

In the 1890s, Teixeira was the leading translator for the Lutetian Society, a group whose mission was "to issue, to its members, translations of such representative master-pieces of fiction by Continental authors as are unprocurable in English in an unmutilated rendering". He oversaw the Society's publication of unexpurgated translations of six banned novels by Émile Zola in 1894–5, contributing his own translation of the third volume in the series, La curée.

During World War I, Teixeira was head of the Intelligence Section, as well as a member of the Advisory Board, of the War Trade Intelligence Department. Midway through the war, Teixeira became a British subject. In June 1920, he was made a Chevalier of the Order of Leopold II.

== Personal life ==
On 20 October 1900, he married Lily Wilde (née Sophie Lily Lees, 1859–1922), the widow of Oscar Wilde's older brother Willie Wilde, and thus became the stepfather of Dolly Wilde, then age 5. Alexander and Lily Teixeira de Mattos had one son, who died a few hours after birth.

Teixeira was known to his acquaintances as a dandy and a fastidious worker, keeping strictly to set hours, and was linked to the Symbolist movement thanks to his friendship and travels with Arthur Symons. He was also personal friends with Maurice Maeterlinck and Louis Couperus, both of whom wrote works he translated. He was politically liberal and a devout Catholic.

Due to ill health, Teixeira traveled on a rest cure in 1920 at Crowborough and the Isle of Wight, returning to his home in Chelsea, London in spring 1921. He worked as usual through the autumn and traveled to Cornwall for the winter. On 5 December 1921, in St Ives, Cornwall he collapsed and died from angina pectoris. The New York Times, in its obituary notice, called him "one of the best translators of foreign languages of the present generation." The high quality and readability of Teixera's work was such that many of his translations are still in print today. For example, though his translation of La curée is over a century old, its accuracy and style have given it a status still unrivaled by more modern versions.

== List of translations ==
The dates given in the list below are the publication dates for Teixeira's translations. Unless otherwise referenced, all information in the list is derived from catalog entries in WorldCat.

Author	Title	Year
Arthur Byl	Yvette Guilbert	1898
Antoine de Castellane	Men and things of my time	1911
François-René de Chateaubriand	The memoirs of François-René, vicomte de Chateaubriand, sometime ambassador to England	1902
Louis Couperus	Ecstasy: A Study of Happiness (translated with John Gray)	1892
Louis Couperus	Majesty: A Novel (Begun by Teixeira, completed by Ernest Dowson)	1894
Louis Couperus	The Books of Small Souls, Vol. I: Small Souls	1914
Louis Couperus	The Books of Small Souls, Vol. II: The Later Life	1915
Louis Couperus	The Books of Small Souls, Vol. III: The Twilight of the Souls	1917
Louis Couperus	The Books of Small Souls, Vol. IV: Dr. Adriaan	1918
Louis Couperus	Old People and the Things that Pass	1918
Louis Couperus	The Tour: A Story of Ancient Egypt	1920
Louis Couperus	The Inevitable	1920
Louis Couperus	The Hidden Force: A Story of Modern Java	1921
Robert d'Humières	Through Isle and Empire	1905
Carl Ewald	My Little Boy	1906
Carl Ewald	Two-Legs	1906
Carl Ewald	The spider, and other tales	1907
Carl Ewald	The Old Room	1908
Carl Ewald	The Four Seasons	1913
Carl Ewald	The Old Willow-tree, and other stories	1921
Carl Ewald	The Pond	1922
Carl Ewald	The twelve sisters and other stories	1923
Jean-Henri Fabre	The Works of J. H. Fabre	1912–1922
Fernand Grenard	Tibet: the country and its inhabitants	1904
Jozef Israëls	Spain: the story of a journey	1900
Melati van Java	The Resident's Daughter	1893
Paul Kruger	The memoirs of Paul Kruger, four times president of the South African republic	1902
Georgette Leblanc	The Children's Bluebird	1913
Georgette Leblanc	The Choice of Life	1914
Georgette Leblanc	The girl who found the blue bird; a visit to Helen Keller	1914
Georgette Leblanc	Maeterlinck's dogs	1920
Maurice Leblanc	The Exploits of Arsène Lupin	1907
Maurice Leblanc	Arsène Lupin versus Holmlock Shears	1909
Maurice Leblanc	813	1910
Maurice Leblanc	The Frontier	1912
Maurice Leblanc	The Confessions of Arsène Lupin	1912
Maurice Leblanc	The Hollow Needle	1913
Maurice Leblanc	The Crystal Stopper	1913
Maurice Leblanc	The Teeth of the Tiger	1915
Maurice Leblanc	The Bomb-Shell: 1914	1916
Maurice Leblanc	The Golden Triangle	1917
Maurice Leblanc	Coffin Island	1920
Maurice Leblanc	The Eyes of Innocence (Original title: Le Roman d'une jeune fille)	1920
Maurice Leblanc	The secret of Sarek	1920
Maurice Leblanc	The Three Eyes	1921
Maurice Leblanc	The Eight Strokes of the Clock	1922
Maurice Leblanc	The Tremendous Event	1922
Maurice Leblanc	The Secret Tomb	1922
Gaston Leroux	The Phantom of the Opera	1911
Gaston Leroux	Balaoo	1913
Jean Léonard	Souvenirs of Léonard, hairdresser to Queen Marie-Antoinette	1897
Maurice Maeterlinck	Chrysanthemums and other essays	1904
Maurice Maeterlinck	The Double Garden	1904
Maurice Maeterlinck	"King Lear" in Paris	1905
Maurice Maeterlinck	My Dog	1906
Maurice Maeterlinck	Old-fashioned flowers and other open-air essays	1906
Maurice Maeterlinck	The Intelligence of the Flowers	1907
Maurice Maeterlinck	Life and Flowers	1907
Maurice Maeterlinck	The Measure of the Hours	1907
Maurice Maeterlinck	News of spring and other nature studies	1907
Maurice Maeterlinck	Joyzelle	1907
Maurice Maeterlinck	The leaf of olive	1908
Maurice Maeterlinck	Mary Magdalene	1910
Maurice Maeterlinck	The Blue Bird	1910
Maurice Maeterlinck	Death	1911
Maurice Maeterlinck	Hours of Gladness	1912
Maurice Maeterlinck	Our Eternity	1913
Maurice Maeterlinck	Our Friend the Dog	1913
Maurice Maeterlinck	The Unknown Guest	1914
Maurice Maeterlinck	Life and letters	1914
Maurice Maeterlinck	The Wrack of the Storm	1916
Maurice Maeterlinck	The Light Beyond	1917
Maurice Maeterlinck	The Burgomaster of Stilemonde	1918
Maurice Maeterlinck	The Betrothal or the Blue Bird Chooses	1918
Maurice Maeterlinck	The Miracle of Saint Anthony	1918
Maurice Maeterlinck	Mountain Paths	1919
G. Hermine Marius	Dutch painting in the nineteenth century	1908
Eugénie de Coucy Oudinot	Memoirs of Marshal Oudinot, duc de Reggio	1896
Xavier Paoli	My royal clients	1911
Peter Rosegger	The forest farm: tales of the Austrian Tyrol	1912
Stijn Streuvels	The Path of Life	1915
Alexis de Tocqueville	The Recollections of Alexis de Tocqueville	1896
August Weissl	The Mystery of the Green Car	1913
Émile Zola	The heirs of Rabourdin	1894
Émile Zola	La curée	1895
