= Arsène Lupin (2004 film) =

- Theatrical release poster
- Directed by: Jean-Paul Salomé
- Written by: Jean-Paul Salomé; Laurent Vachaud
- Based on: Arsène Lupin; 1908 play by Maurice Leblanc; Francis de Croisset
- Produced by: Stéphane Marsil
- Starring: Romain Duris; Kristin Scott Thomas; Pascal Greggory
- Cinematography: Pascal Ridao
- Edited by: Marie-Pierre Renaud
- Music by: Debbie Wiseman
- Distributed by: Société nouvelle de distribution
- Release date: 13 October 2004
- Running time: 131 minutes
- Countries: France; Italy; Spain; United Kingdom
- Language: French
- Budget: $20.4 million
- Box office: $9.7 million

Arsène Lupin is a 2004 French-language adventure crime film directed by Jean-Paul Salomé, based on the popular series of crime novels created by Maurice Leblanc. An international co-production of France, Spain, Italy and the United Kingdom, the film stars Romain Duris, Kristin Scott Thomas and Pascal Greggory.

== Plot ==
The film follows gentleman thief Arsène Lupin from a small boy, through the death of his father, and his adult years when he meets the strange woman, Joséphine, who appears to be immortal and uses a hypnotic drug to enslave people to her will. Arsène's ethos is to steal from the rich and deserving crooks. In this film he comes up against two parties, a secret society and Joséphine, who are intent on gathering three crucifixes which will reveal the secret of a lost treasure which contains secrets about Mehdi.

== Cast ==
- Romain Duris as Arsène Lupin
- Kristin Scott Thomas as Joséphine Balsamo, comtesse de Cagliostro
- Pascal Greggory as Beaumagnan
- Eva Green as Clarisse de Dreux-Soubise
- Robin Renucci as Duke of Dreux-Soubise
- Patrick Toomey as Léonard
- Mathieu Carrière as Duke of Orléans
- Philippe Magnan as Bonnetot
- Philippe Lemaire as Cardinal of Etigues
- Marie Bunel as Henriette d'Andrésy
- Aurélien Wiik as Jean Lupin
- Philippe Laudenbach as The Prefect
- Françoise Lépine as The Duchess
- Xavier Beauvois as Doctor
- Arthur Dupont as Seller Newspaper

== Production ==
The film adapts elements from many of Leblanc's stories, including The Arrest of Arsène Lupin (the ship gala which introduces the adult Lupin), The Queen's Necklace (Lupin's childhood), Sherlock Holmes Arrives Too Late, The Hollow Needle (which provides the treasure that is a key component of the plot), 813, and The Countess Of Cagliostro (which brought over one of Lupin's recurring antagonists).

== Reception ==
Lisa Nesselson of Variety dubbed the film, 'A thoroughly entertaining period romp bursting with intrigue'. Empire awarded the film 3 out of five stars, criticizing Duris' performance, but complimenting the action and special effects. Screen Daily praised the production values, but found the plot unclear.
