= Arsène Lupin versus Herlock Sholmes =

1908 collection by Maurice Leblanc

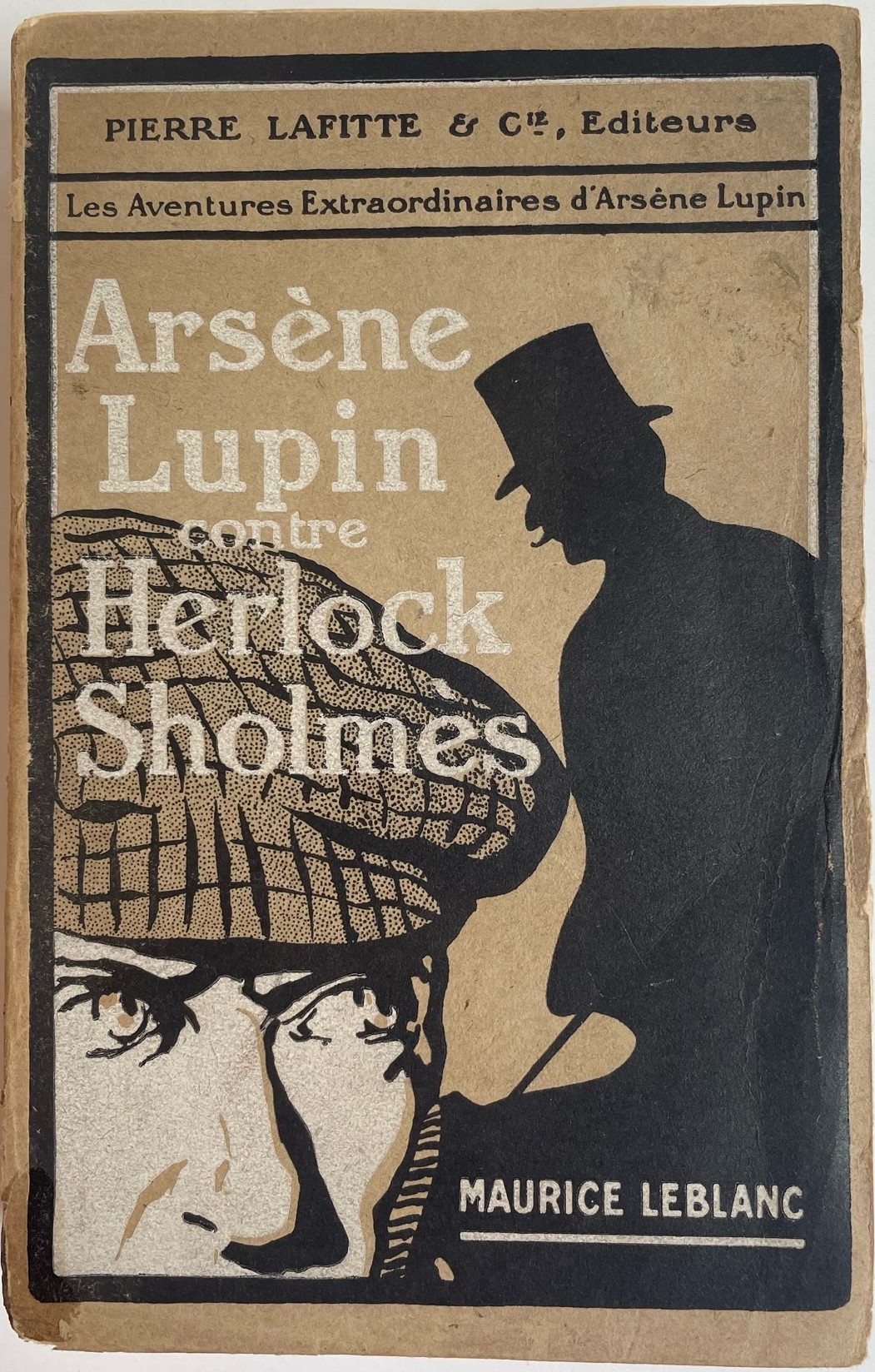
- Cover
- Author: Maurice Leblanc
- Original title: Arsène Lupin contre Herlock Sholmès
- Translator: George Morehead; Alexander Teixeira de Mattos
- Language: French
- Series: Arsène Lupin
- Genre: Crime fiction
- Publication date: 1908
- Publication place: France
- English publication date: 1910
- Media type: Print
- Preceded by: Arsène Lupin, Gentleman Burglar
- Followed by: The Hollow Needle

Arsène Lupin versus Herlock Sholmes (French: Arsène Lupin contre Herlock Sholmès) is the second collection of Arsène Lupin stories written by Maurice Leblanc, featuring two adventures following a match of wits between Lupin and Herlock Sholmes. The character "Herlock Sholmes" is a transparent reference to Sherlock Holmes of Arthur Conan Doyle's detective stories, who appeared in "Sherlock Holmes Arrives Too Late", one of the eight stories in the first collection, Arsène Lupin, Gentleman Burglar. The collection was translated twice into English, as Arsène Lupin versus Herlock Sholmes in the US (1910, by George Morehead), and as Arsène Lupin versus Holmlock Shears in the UK (1910, by Alexander Teixeira de Mattos, printed as The Blonde Lady in the US).

== Publication history ==
The two stories were initially published in the magazine Je sais tout from November 1906. The first story, "The Blonde Lady", was published from November 1906 to April, 1907, while the second, "The Jewish Lamp", appeared in September and October, 1907. The collection of these two stories was published with modifications in February, 1908, and in 1914, another edition appeared with further modifications. The English translations appeared in 1910.

The first two chapters were published using the name Sherlock Holmes, but Arthur Conan Doyle stopped the continued use of his character by 1907. In order to not abandon the existing story, Holmes' name was simply changed to Herlock Sholmès in future chapters and publications. The name Herlock Sholmès (or Sholmes in English) had been in use in parodies of Doyle's works by other authors since at least 1894.

The first American edition of Arsène Lupin, Gentleman Burglar, translated by George Morehead, restored the character's name back to Sherlock Holmes, while the second book, also translated by Morehead, was published as Arsène Lupin versus Herlock Sholmes. The British translation by Alexander Teixeira de Mattos changed his name to Holmlock Shears.

== Contents ==
The two English collections contain the following chapters or stories:

Arsène Lupin versus Herlock Sholmes (2 stories)

1) "The Blond Lady" (novel)

- Lottery Ticket No. 514
- The Blue Diamond
- Herlock Sholmes Opens Hostilities
- Light in the Darkness
- An Abduction
- Second Arrest of Arsène Lupin

2) "The Jewish Lamp" (tale)

- The Shipwreck

Arsène Lupin versus Holmlock Shears, aka The Blonde Lady (2 stories)

- "The Blonde Lady", comprising six chapters
  - Number 514, Series 23
  - The Blue Diamond
  - Holmlock Shears Opens Hostilities
  - A Glimmer in the Darkness
  - Kidnapped
  - The Second Arrest of Arsène Lupin
- "The Jewish Lamp", comprising two chapters
  - Chapter I
  - Chapter II

== Summary ==
The first story, "The Blonde Lady", opens with the purchase of an antique desk by a mathematics professor. The desk is subsequently stolen, as it turns out, by Arsène Lupin. Later, both Lupin and the professor realize that a lottery ticket, left inadvertently in the desk, is the winning ticket, and Lupin proceeds to ensure he obtains half of the winnings while executing a near-impossible escape with a blonde lady. After the theft of the Blue Diamond, again by a blonde lady, Ganimard made the connection to Lupin and an appeal was made to Herlock Sholmes to match wits with Lupin. Inadvertently, Lupin and his biographer met with the newly arrived Sholmes and his assistant, Dr. Wilson, in a Parisian restaurant, and they shared a cautious détente before Lupin sets off to lay his traps. Despite Lupin's efforts, Sholmes is able to unveil the identity of the blonde lady and Lupin's involvement in the crimes linked to her. Lupin succeeds in trapping Sholmes, however, and sends him off to Southampton in a boat, but Sholmes manages to escape back to Paris and engineer the arrest of Lupin. After Sholmes leaves, however, Lupin outfoxes his French captors and manages to bid farewell to Sholmes and Wilson at the Gare du Nord.

"The Jewish Lamp" opens with another appeal to Herlock Sholmes for help in recovering a Jewish lamp. After reading the appeal, Sholmes is shocked to read a second letter, this time by Lupin and arriving on the same day's post, which warns him not to intervene. Sholmes is outraged by Lupin's audacity and resolves to go to Paris. At the Gare du Nord, Sholmes is accosted by a young lady, who again warns him not to intervene, and finds that the Echo de France, Lupin's mouthpiece newspaper, is proclaiming his arrival. Sholmes proceeds to investigate the crime and finds out the true reason for Lupin's appeal not to intervene.

== Adaptations ==
A 1910 film serial entitled Arsène Lupin contra Sherlock Holmes adapted Leblanc's stories. German copyright laws allowed the producers to return "Sholmes" to the proper "Sherlock Holmes" who was portrayed by Viggo Larsen.

In the 2015 video game The Great Ace Attorney: Adventures, a character named Herlock Sholmes appears in the English translation in reference to the Leblanc book. The name Sherlock Holmes was avoided due to legal complications, as the Doyle character was still partially protected by copyright in the United States when the game was released.

== See also ==
- Pop culture references to Sherlock Holmes
