= Arsène Lupin contra Sherlock Holmes =

1910 film

- Directed by: Viggo Larsen
- Based on: Arsène Lupin contre Herlock Sholmès by Maurice Leblanc
- Starring: Viggo Larsen; Paul Otto
- Distributed by: PAGU
- Release date: 23 July 1910
- Running time: 5 episodes
- Country: Germany
- Language: Silent with German intertitles

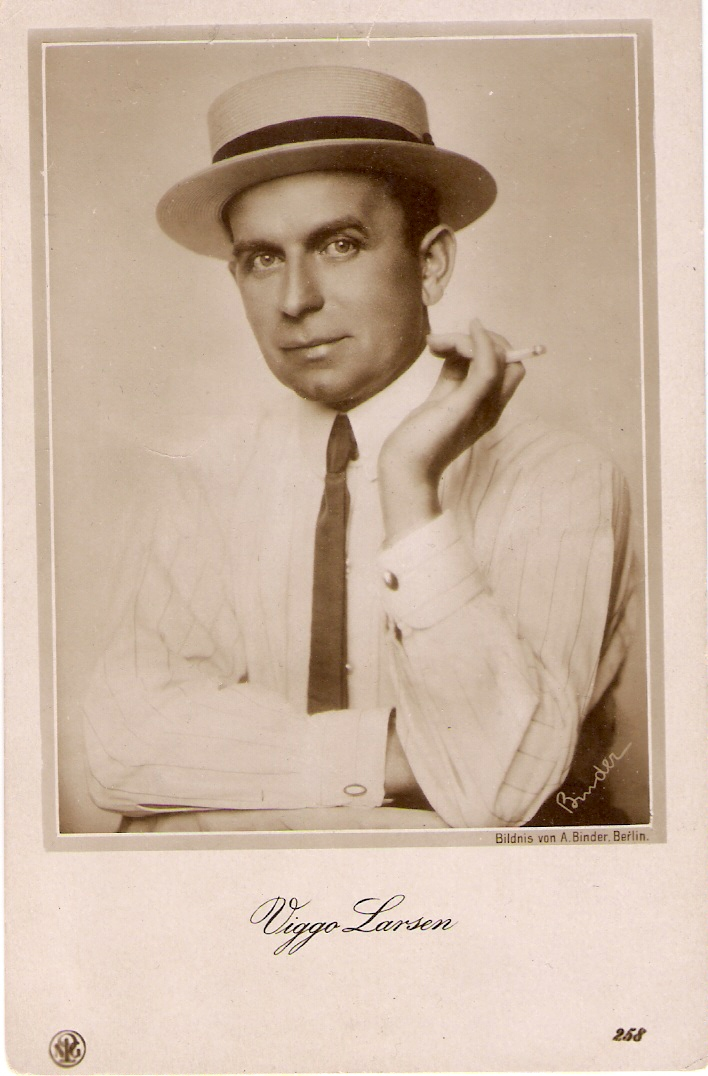
Viggo Larsen

Arsène Lupin contra Sherlock Holmes is a 1910 German drama film serial directed by Viggo Larsen. The survival status of any of the episodes is unknown.

== Cast ==
- Viggo Larsen as Sherlock Holmes
- Paul Otto as Arsène Lupin

== List of episodes ==
- "Der Alte Sekretar" (The Old Secretary) also known as “Arsene Lupin”, released 20 August 1910
- "Der Blaue Diamant" (The Blue Diamond), released 17 September 1910
- "Die Falschen Rembrandts" (The Fake Rembrandts) also known as “The Two Rembrandts”, released 7 October 1910
- "Die Flucht" (The Escape), released 24 December 1910
- "Arsene Lupins Ende" (The End of Arsene Lupin), released 4 March 1911

== See also ==
- List of film serials
- List of film serials by studio
