= The Billions of Arsène Lupin =

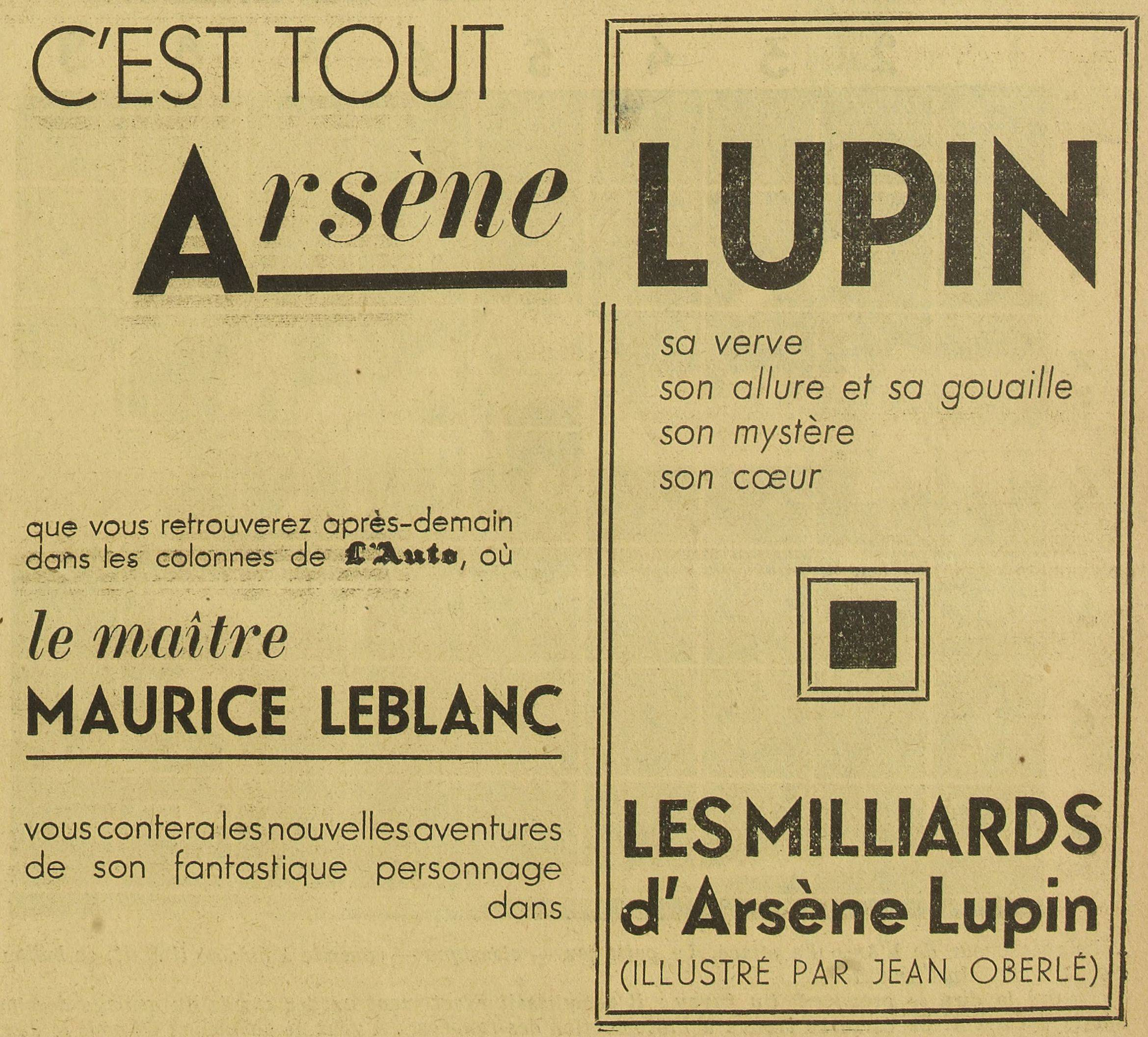
The Billions of Arsène Lupin

The Billions of Arsène Lupin (French: Les Milliards d'Arsène Lupin) is a detective novel by Maurice Leblanc following gentleman thief Arsène Lupin. It was published in 29 daily instalments, illustrated by Jean Oberlé, in L'Auto from 10 January to 11 February 1939, then published in a 16mo volume by Hachette (coll. ‘The Enigma’ No. 13) in November 1941, with illustrations by André Pécoud.

The 1941 Hachette edition of a story that was not actually written beyond 1939 is the only edition prior to the inclusion in 1987 of this final Arsène Lupin story in Francis Lacassin's collection (volume 4, published in 1987). These are therefore two posthumous editions. As illness and death had prevented the author from finalising this novel, the family refused to allow a second publication for 46 years, out of respect for the novelist's memory.

The 1941 Hachette edition is incomplete: one of the 29 instalments in L'Auto, No. 23 dated 3 February 1939, was omitted by mistake. This error was repeated in the 1987 Robert Laffont reissue: volume 4 of the ‘Bouquins’ collection is similarly truncated.

== Summary ==
The novel centres on Patricia, a young American woman who works as the assistant to James Mac Allermy, founder of Allô-Police, a crime-focused tabloid newspaper in the United States. Mac Allermy holds his secretary in high esteem and envisages a promising future for her within the company. He is aware that she was previously seduced and subsequently abandoned by his own son, who later married someone considered more suitable to his social position. As a result of this affair, Patricia has become a single mother, and her young child, Rodolphe, provides her with the determination to continue facing life’s challenges.

One evening, whilst on the newspaper’s premises, Patricia is attacked by a criminal known as “Le Sauvage” (transl. 'The Savage'). She is saved at the last moment by an unknown man of remarkable strength and composure. To her surprise, the assailant, astonished by the man’s prowess, asks him whether he might be Arsène Lupin.

The plot expands with a series of mysteries: Lupin’s presence in America, the murder of Mac Allermy and his business lawyer following a clandestine nighttime meeting involving eleven men, and the disappearance of a tan leather briefcase stolen from Mac Allermy on the night of his death. Le Sauvage, now in possession of the briefcase, speaks of an enormous fortune linked to its contents.

Drawn by the promise of this fortune and by the unresolved circumstances surrounding her employer’s death, Patricia travels to France, which had been Mac Allermy’s intended destination. The journey proves eventful, and France becomes the setting for her efforts to uncover the truth. She is also guided by the silver whistle given to her by the mysterious stranger during their first encounter, accompanied by the instruction: “In case of danger, whistle continuously. I will come...”
