= The Last Love of Arsène Lupin =

Novel by Maurice Leblanc

First edition (publ. Balland)

The Last Love of Arsène Lupin is a novel written by Maurice Leblanc, published posthumously. It relates the later years of his frequent hero, Arsène Lupin.

== Publication history ==
This work, begun under the title "The Last Adventure of Arsène Lupin", was found by chance in 2011 "on top of a cupboard in a beige shirt with rusty hooks" by Florence Boespflug-Leblanc. A foreword was written by Florence Leblanc. According to the deceased's wishes, the story was transcribed without corrections from a 160-page typescript. A preface was written by Jacques Derouard. According to him, Leblanc had worked on it in September 1936, shortly before a stroke. He started to correct it at the beginning of the following year, in "a very shaky hand".

== Synopsis ==
In a prologue we learn that Lupin's great-grandfather was one of Napoleon's generals, for whom he will successfully complete a singular mission: to bring the English version of the journal that contains the family Montcalmet revelations of Joan of Arc on the "high directives of English politics," absent from the French version. Finally, to complete the genealogy of the hero Cabot, Lupin finally married Countess Montcalmet.

Cora, a blonde-haired, green-eyed woman appears. The faithful Captain Andrew Savery is presented to her by Count Hairfall, and he loves her from afar. Unexpectedly the Prince of Lerna commits suicide. Thereafter, Cora soon learns from Lord Hairfall that her biological father is Lord Harrington, a close relative of the English Royal Family.

Newspapers report the disappearance of Lema's fortune: four million pounds of gold sent by the Bank of England to the Bank of France in two bags. Lupin reviews the transfer closely. The bags mysteriously landed near the Julainville in the "zone" between Gennevilliers and Pantin and then disappeared. The police and Fourvier rush to the "zone" to investigate, but Lupin finds the bags before anyone else.

Lupin is an old thief who does not hide his true identity from Fourvier. He turns into an instructor for the wayward child (Fourvier). This company is dedicated to him and he is familiarly called Captain Kakariko, alluding to his rallying cry. With the help of brother and sister, Joséphin Maria Theresa that he protects his beloved from danger.

The rest of the story is a tale of international espionage targeting the old "Book of Montcalmet" where friends are not always friends, but the hero will triumph with panache.
