= Le Clos Arsène Lupin, Maison Maurice Leblanc =

Museum in France

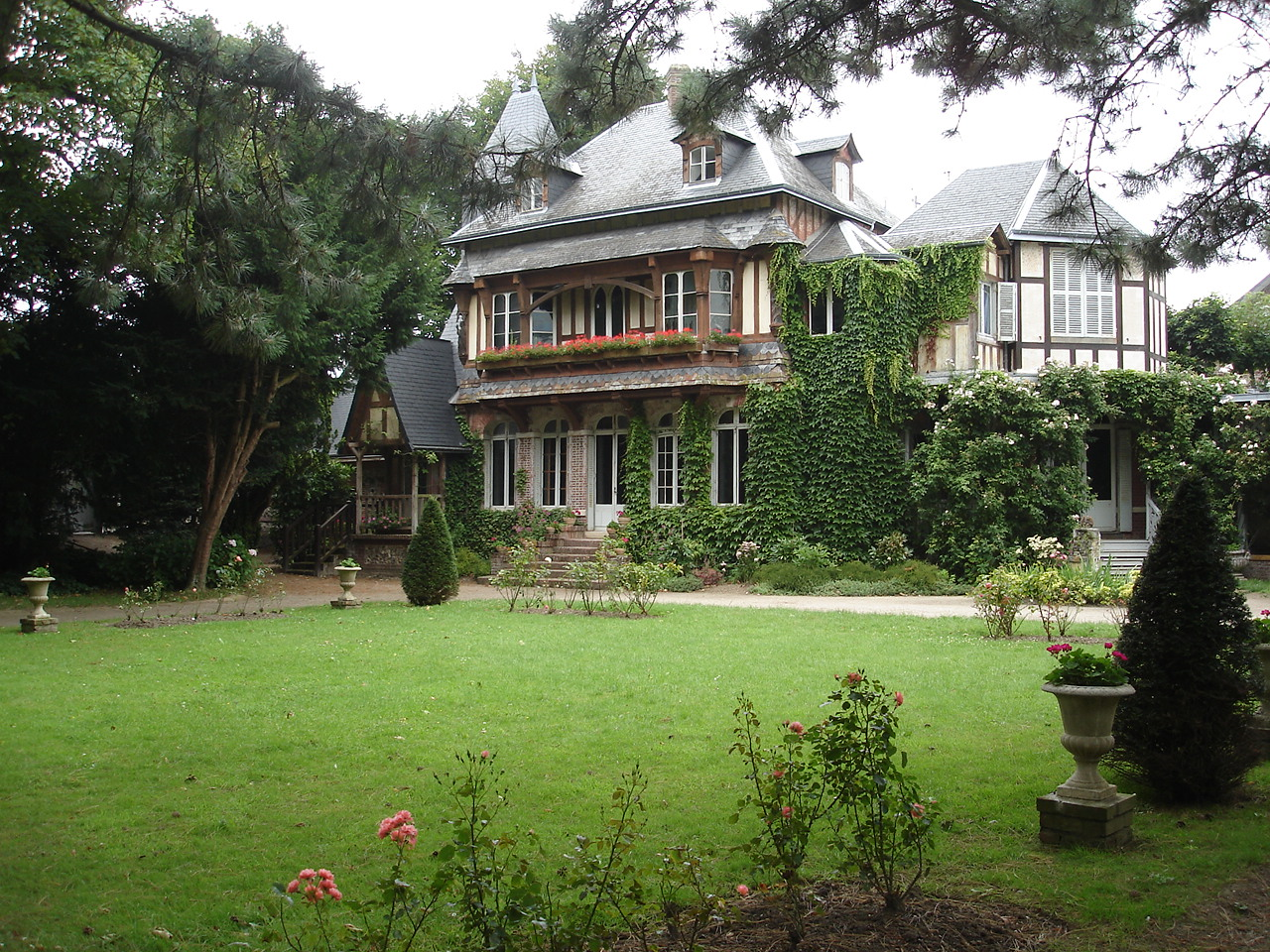
The museum Le Clos Arsène Lupin, Maison Maurice Leblanc in Étretat.

Le Clos Arsène Lupin, Maison Maurice Leblanc is a museum in France dedicated to the fictional character Arsène Lupin, a gentleman thief created by the writer Maurice Leblanc.

The museum is located at 15, rue Guy-de-Maupassant in Étretat, Normandy, the former home of Maurice Leblanc. It opened to the public in June 1999, after the house was bought by Maurice Leblanc's granddaughter, Florence Boespflug-Leblanc. Le Clos Lupin houses photos, paintings, writings and other personal accessories of the writer, some of which are original, as well as presenting an audio-visual tour celebrating his fictional hero Arsène Lupin.

== History ==
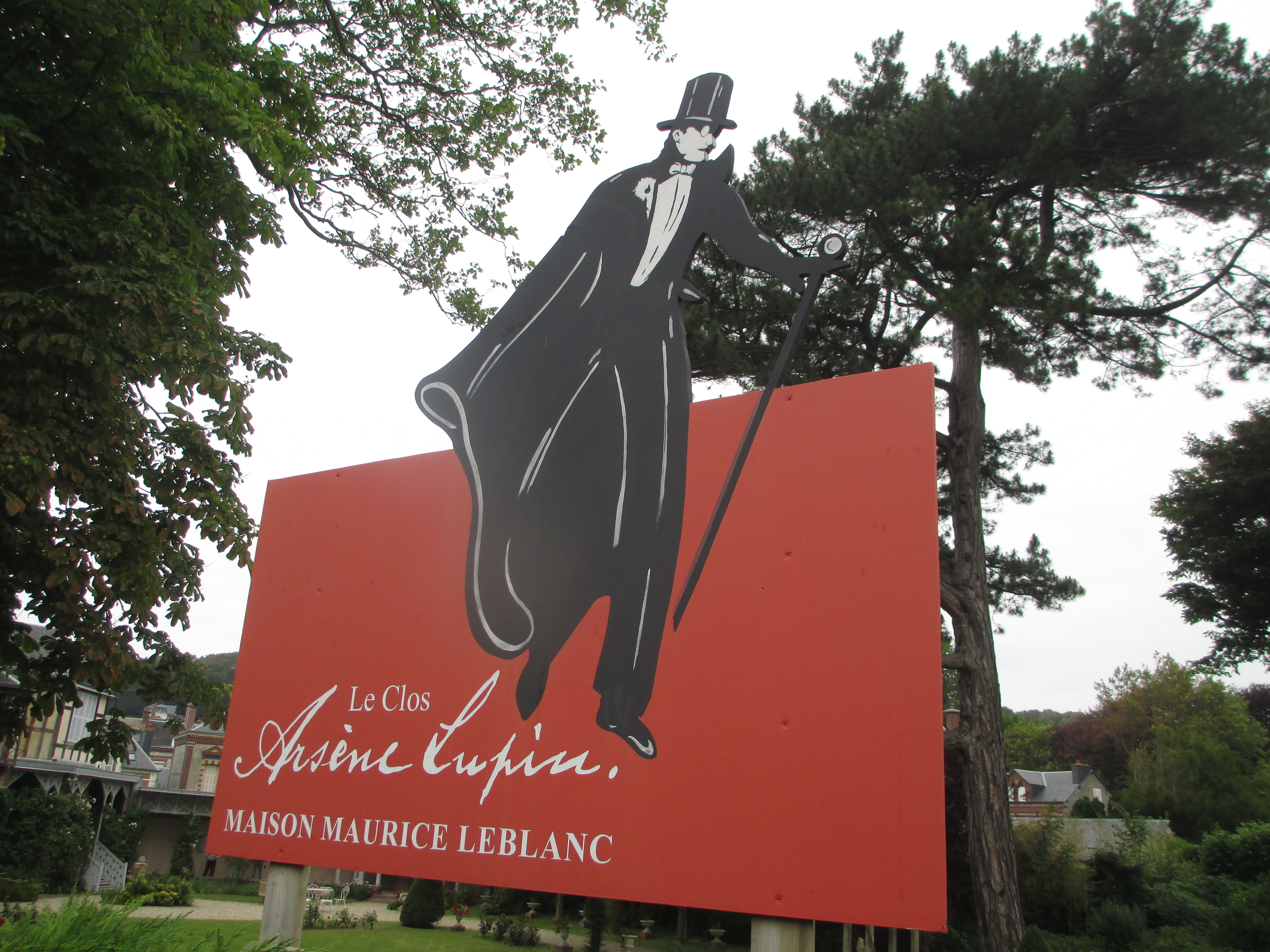
Le Clos Lupin.

This Anglo-Norman half-timbered house was built around 1850. In 1918 writer Maurice Leblanc bought the historic villa as a home and a place to work. It originally bore the name "The Sphinx", but Leblanc renamed it "Clos Lupin" in homage to Arsène Lupin, whom he conceived, and the Lupinus flowers he planted in the garden. He lived here for more than twenty years.

The house was confiscated during the German occupation in World War II. Subsequently it was sold by Leblanc's son in 1952. In 1998 Florence Boespflug, Maurice Leblanc's granddaughter, was able to buy back the “Clos Lupine” and establish a museum with accessories from her grandfather and his most famous fictional character. The museum opened in 1999 under its current name Le Clos Arsène Lupin, Maison Maurice Leblanc. From its opening in 1999 to 2004, it had more than 125,000 visitors.

In 2011, the property and the fund of the collection were bought for €639,000 by the Haute-Normandie Region (owning 45%), the Department of Seine-Maritime (owning 45%) and the municipality of Étretat (owning 10%). Clos Lupin is included in the Historic route of writers' houses. According to director Maryse Alix in 2016, the Clos Lupin attracted 17,000 to 25,000 visitors that year, and Clos Lupin was "the most visited writer's house in France".

== Description and tour ==
The building is a two-storey Anglo-Norman style villa from the 19th century. Parts of the ground floor and the first floor are used as museum rooms today. The garden contains old pine trees, lupins, statues, a historic fountain and a pergola overgrown with wisteria.

The tour takes place in the following seven stages:

1. Le cabinet de travail de Maurice Leblanc (Maurice Leblanc's office)
2. Le repaire d'un gentleman (A gentleman's lair)
3. La chambre du Chiffre (The Cipher's room)
4. La salle des 47 "Lupin" ("Lupin" Room 47)
5. On touche au but! (We are reaching our goal!)
6. Le secret de l'Aiguille (The Secret of the Needle)
7. Lupin court toujours (Lupin always running)

During the audio-visual tour of the museum in English or French, the visitor learns about his life and work from the supposed voice of Maurice Leblanc. The stages are accompanied by a variety of visual special effects, and the 'author' is haunted by his fictional character Arsène Lupin (in French, voiced by Georges Descrières, who portrayed him in the 1970s television series). A dialogue develops between the two, in the course of which the museum visitor learns the secret of “L'Aiguille creuse' (The Hollow Needle).

== Arsène Lupin Prize ==
Created in 2006 at the instigation of the Association du Clos Arsène Lupin and Florence Boespflug-Leblanc, granddaughter of Maurice Leblanc, the Arsène Lupin Prize for Crime Fiction sought to distinguish each year, a detective novel that combined the humor and detective mystery of Maurice Leblanc's Arsène Lupin stories. A €1,000 prize was awarded each year at a ceremony at Clos Lupin. The prize ran for 14 years until 2020.

== Gallery ==
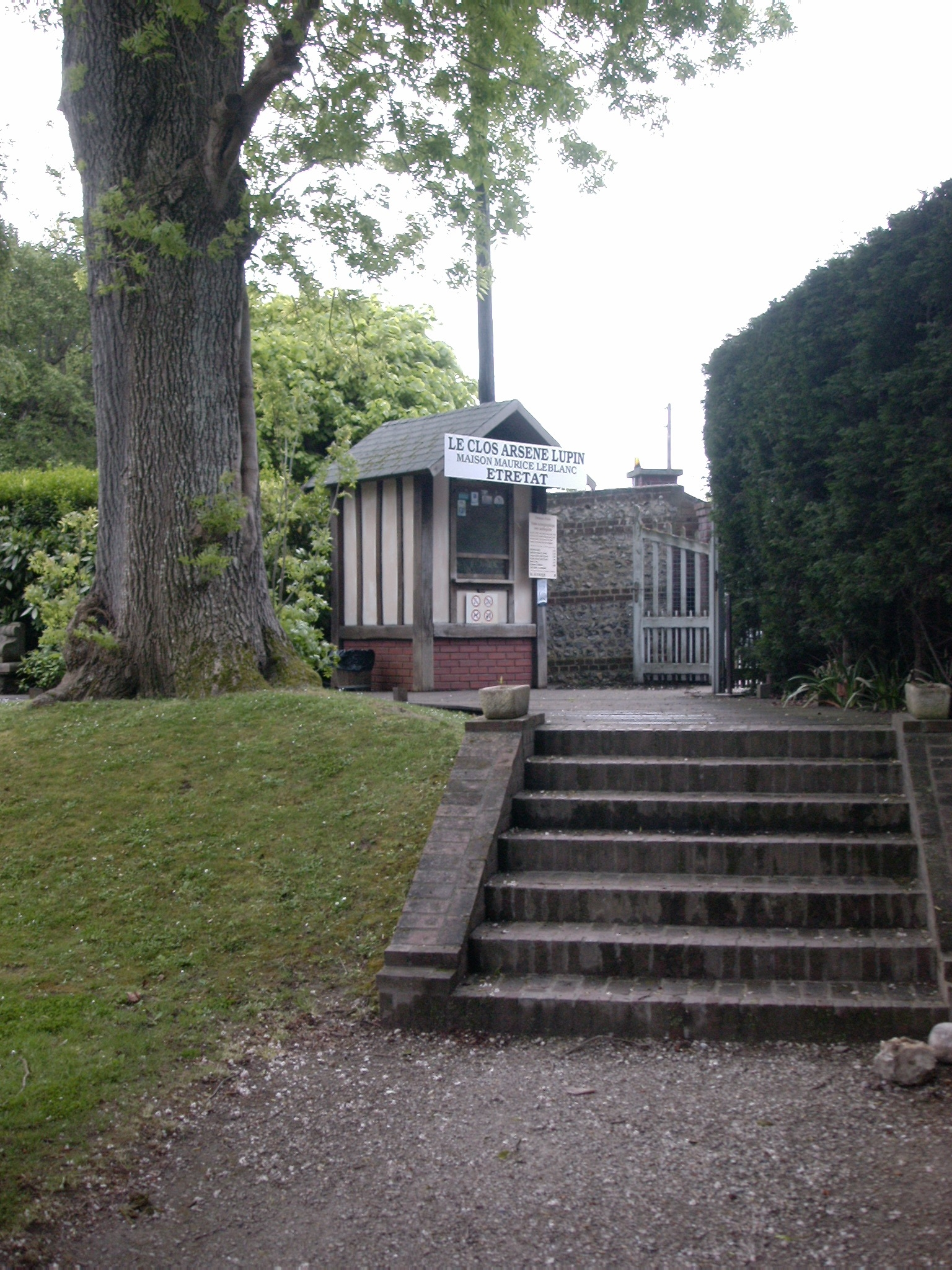
Ticket sales point

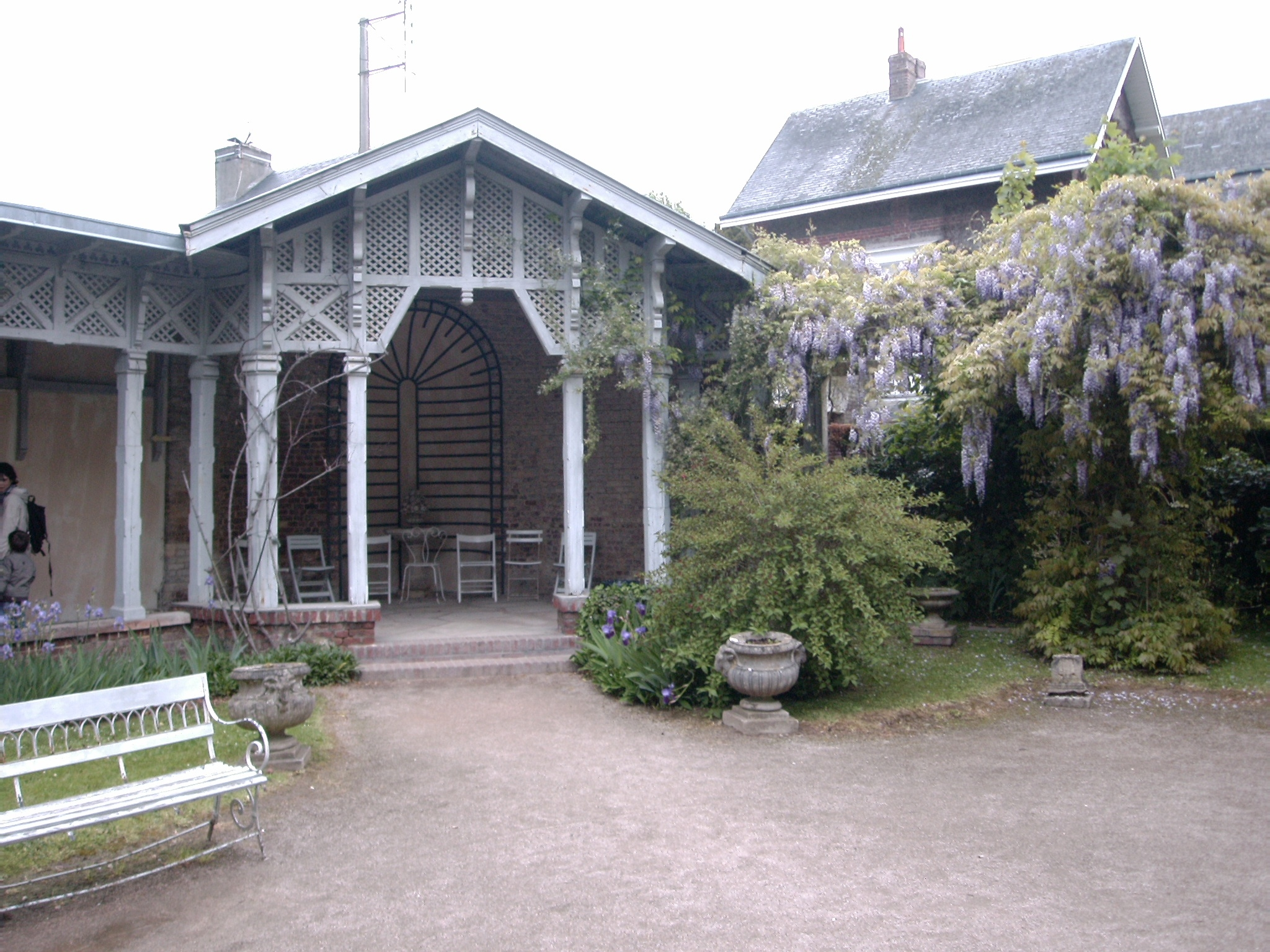
Pergola

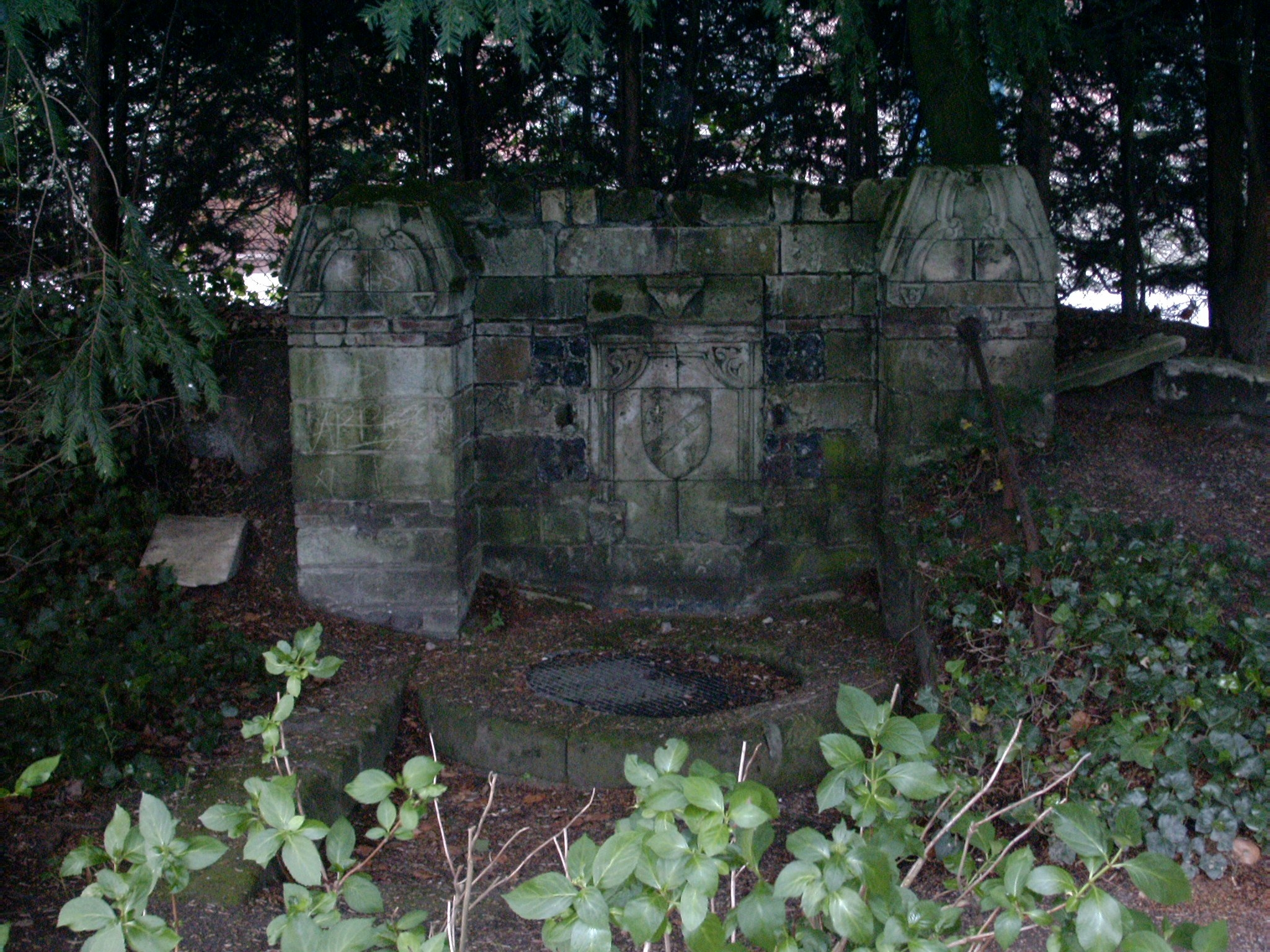
Historical fountain

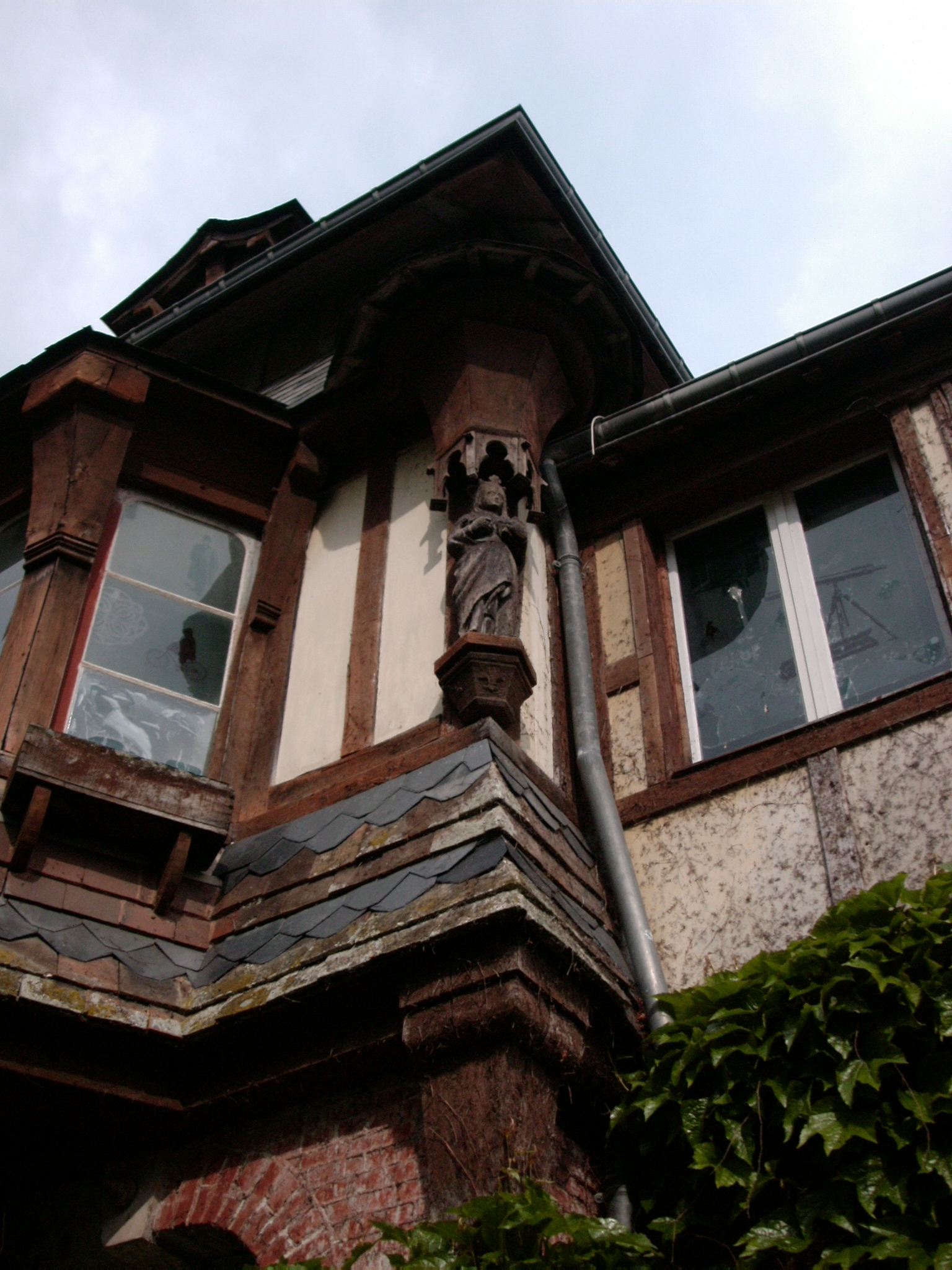
Wooden figure on the house

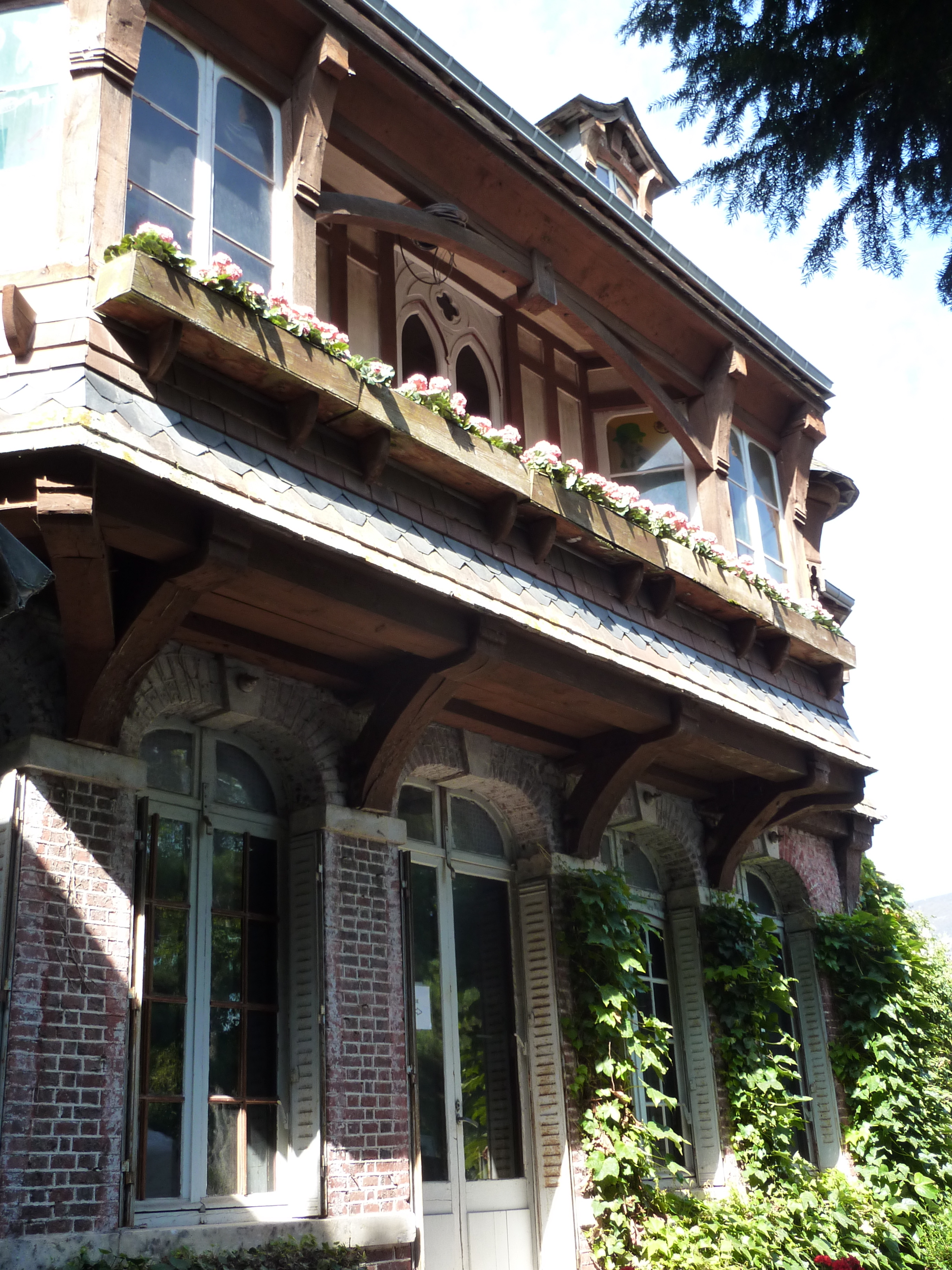
outside view

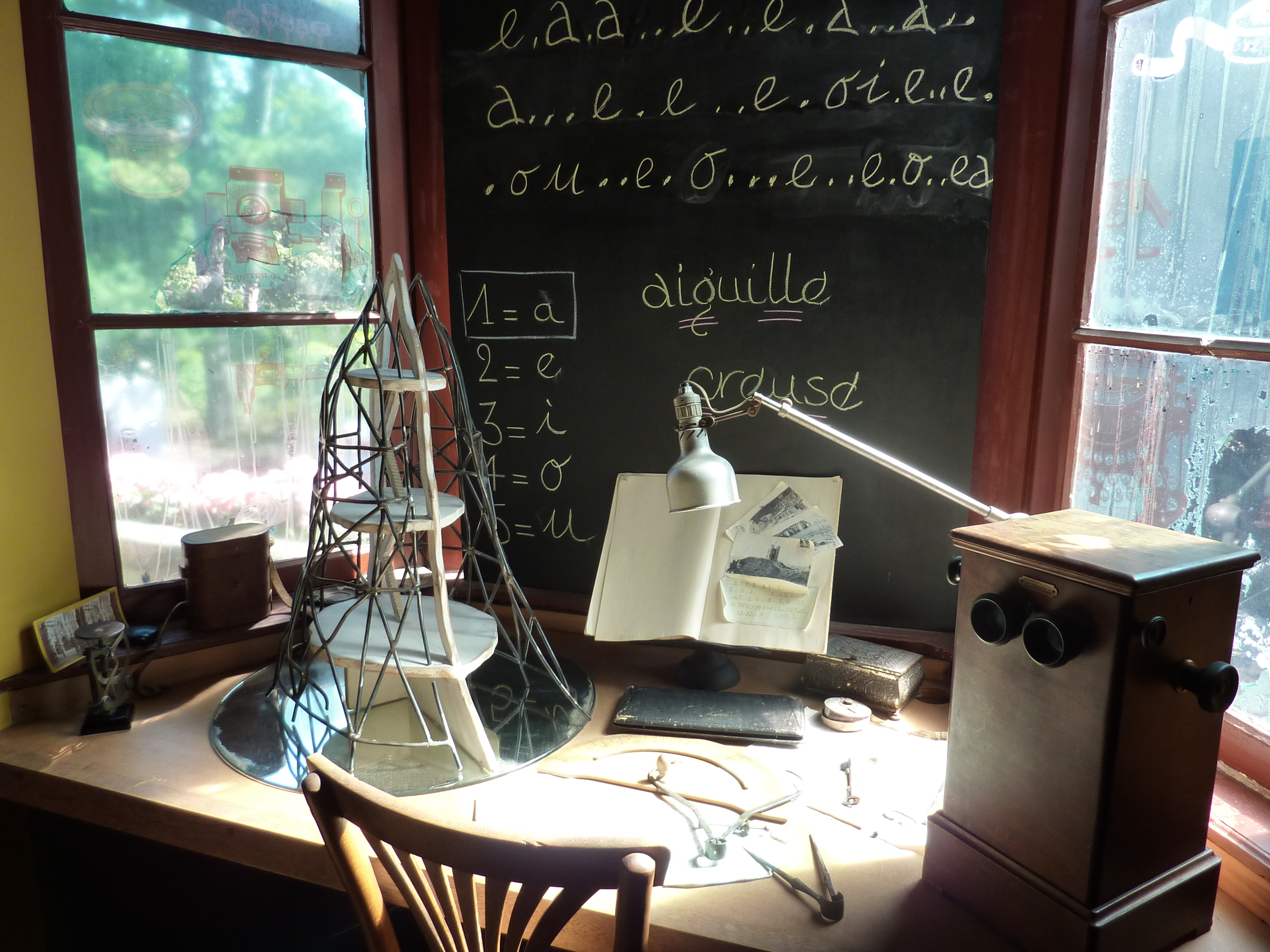
Balcony desk

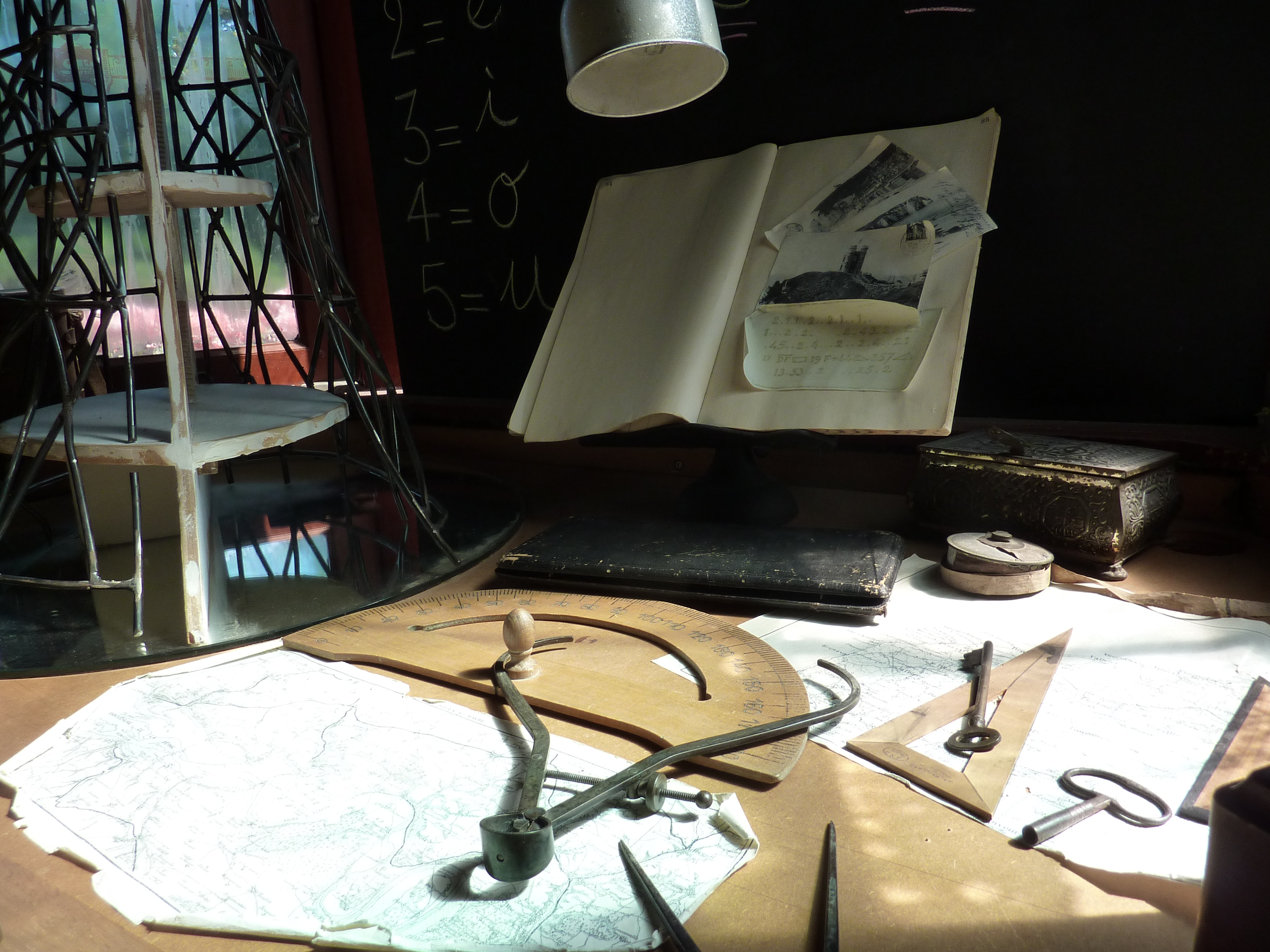
Balcony desk, closer
