= The Mysterious Mansion =

1928 novel by Maurice Leblanc

The Mysterious Mansion (French: La Demeure Mystérieuse) is a mystery novel by Maurice Leblanc featuring Arsène Lupin published in French first as a serial in June–July 1928 and as a book by Pierre Lafitte in July 1929.

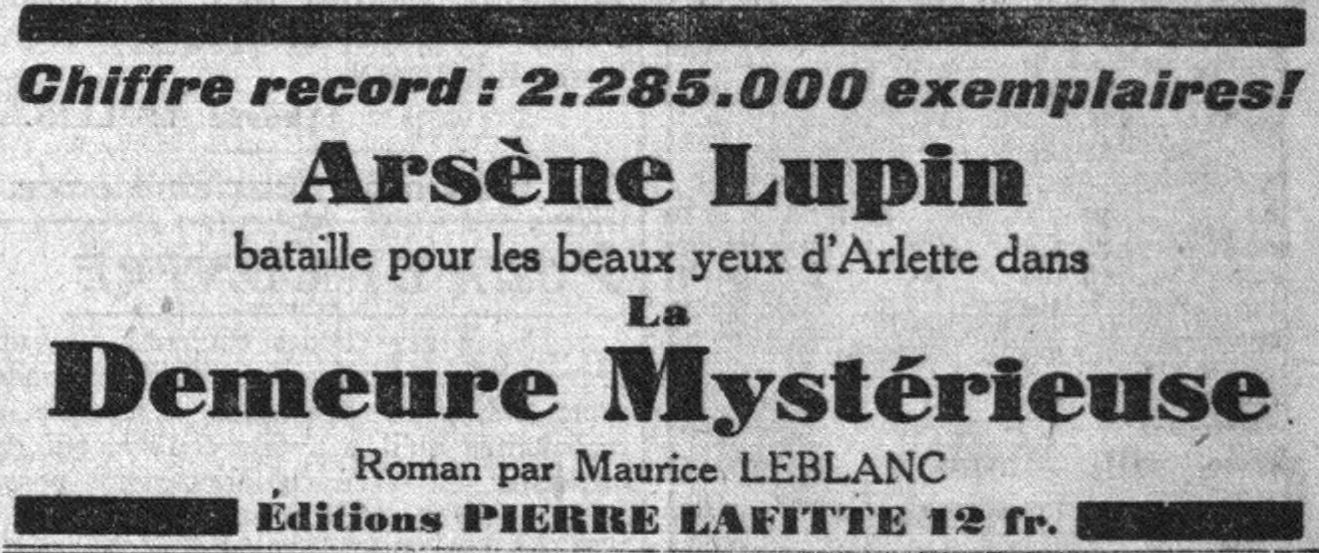
The Mysterious Mansion

A first English translation was published in New York by The Macaulay Co in 1930 as The Mélamare Mystery (translator unmentioned) and a second one (as The Mysterious Mansion) in 2014 by The Koch and Co Agency (translated by Jean Pierre Koch with Ellen Kapusniak).

== Summary ==
After the sensational theft of diamonds at the Paris Opera and the abduction of an actress, Régine Aubry, the jovial jewel magnate Van Houben has no choice but to use the services of gentleman-sailor Jean d'Enneris, a.k.a. Arsène Lupin, who joins his own rival Brigadier Béchoux (already met in The Barnett & Co Agency and La Barre-Y-Va). With a second kidnapping, that of pretty model Arlette Mazolle, the mystery thickens. Soon it leads to the hôtel particulier, or mansion, of Count de Mélamare, and d'Enneris uncovers a history of hatred between two rival families revolving around the mansion.
