= Arsène Lupin =

Fictional gentleman thief created by Maurice Leblanc

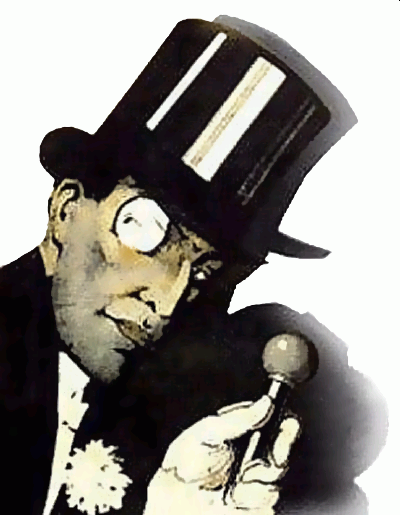
- Cover of "Arsène Lupin, Gentleman-Cambrioleur" (1907)
- First appearance: "The Arrest of Arsène Lupin" (1905)
- Created by: Maurice Leblanc

In-universe information
- Gender: Male
- Occupation: Gentleman Thief
- Family: Theophraste Lupin (father, deceased), Henriette D'Andresy (mother, deceased)
- Spouse: Clarice d'Etigues (deceased)
- Children: Jean (by Clarice d'Etigues), Genevieve (unknown mother), the heir of Borostyria (by Queen Olga), Josephin and Marie-Therese (by Angelique la Cloche)
- Nationality: French

Arsène Lupin (French: [aʁsɛn lypɛ̃]) is a fictional gentleman thief and master of disguise created in 1905 by French writer Maurice Leblanc. The character was first introduced in a series of short stories serialized in the magazine Je sais tout. The first story, "The Arrest of Arsène Lupin", was published on 15 July 1905. Lupin is often described as the criminal counterpart to Sherlock Holmes, often encountering "Herlock Sholmès" in his own adventures.

The character has also appeared in a number of books by other writers as well as numerous films, stage plays, comic books and television adaptations.

== Antecedents ==
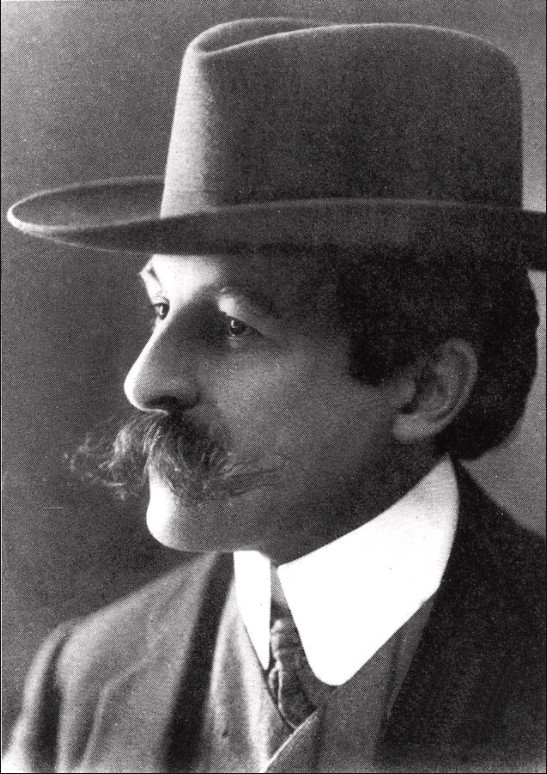
Maurice Leblanc (1864–1941), 1907, Arsène Lupin's creator

Arsène Lupin was a literary descendant of Pierre Alexis Ponson du Terrail's fictional character Rocambole, whose adventures were published from 1857 to 1870. Like Rocambole, Lupin is often a force for good while operating on the wrong side of the law. Lupin shares similarities with E. W. Hornung's gentleman thief A. J. Raffles, whose stories were published from 1898 to 1909. Both Raffles and Lupin have inspired later characters such as Louis Joseph Vance's The Lone Wolf (created in 1914) and Leslie Charteris's The Saint (created in 1928).

== Overview ==
Lupin was featured in 17 novels and 39 novellas by Leblanc, with the novellas or short stories collected into book form for a total of 24 books. The number becomes 25 if the 1923 novel The Secret Tomb is counted: Lupin does not appear in it, but the main character Dorothée solves one of Arsène Lupin's four fabulous secrets.

Several Arsène Lupin novels contain some fantasy elements: a radioactive "god-stone" that cures people and causes mutations is the object of an epic battle in L’Île aux trente cercueils; the secret of the Fountain of Youth, a mineral water source hidden beneath a lake in the Auvergne, is the goal sought by the protagonists in La Demoiselle aux yeux verts; finally, in La Comtesse de Cagliostro, Lupin's arch-enemy and lover is none other than Joséphine Balsamo, the alleged granddaughter of Cagliostro himself.

== Arsène Lupin and Sherlock Holmes ==
=== Leblanc's "Herlock Sholmès" ===
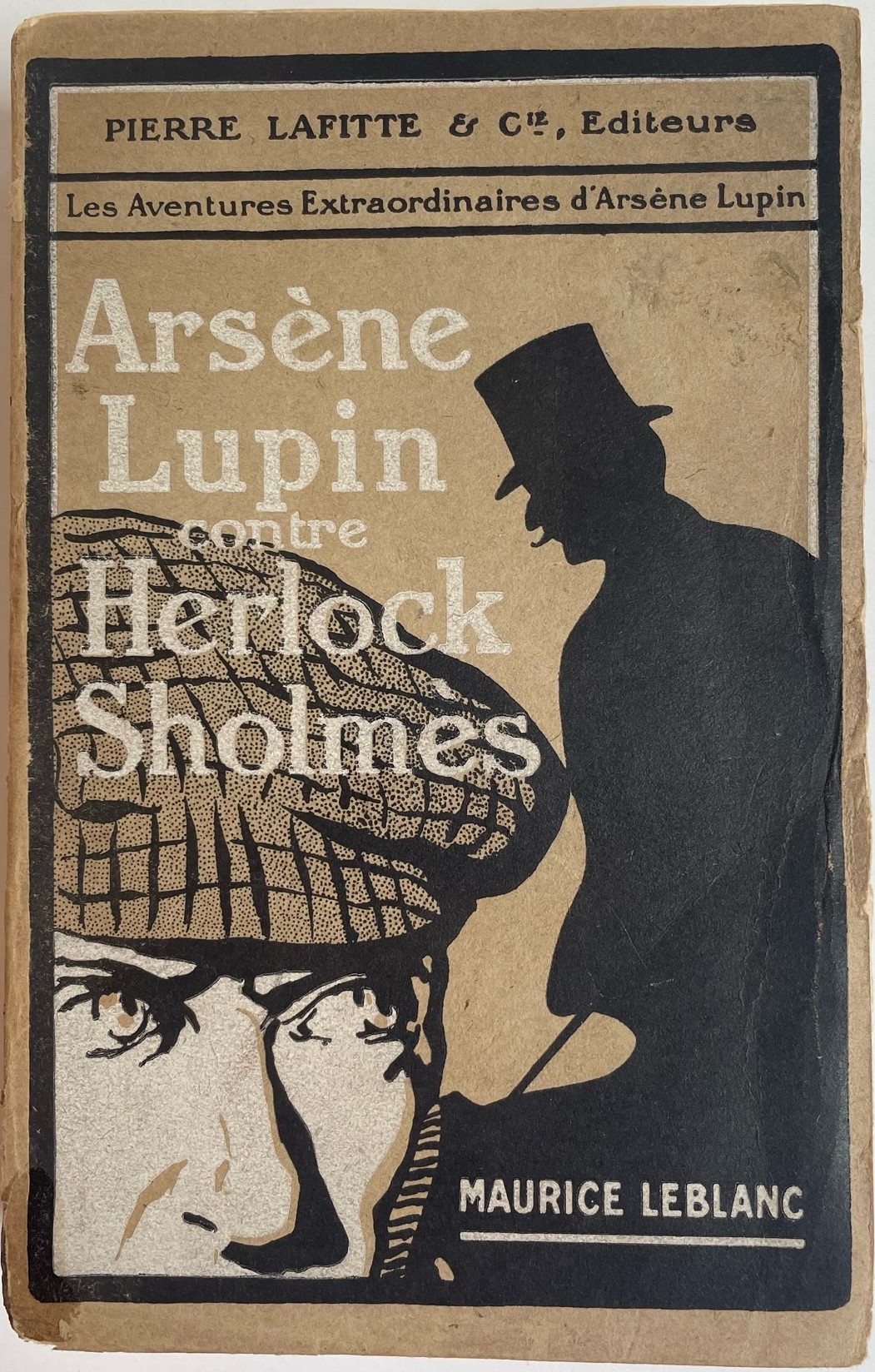
Arsène Lupin Contre Herlock Sholmès

Leblanc introduced Sherlock Holmes to Lupin in the short story "Sherlock Holmes Arrives Too Late" in Je sais tout No. 17, 15 June 1906. In it, an aged Holmes meets a young Lupin for the first time. After legal objections from Arthur Conan Doyle, the name was changed to "Herlock Sholmès" either because of literary copyright on the character, or, as Maurice Leblanc's son claims, at Doyle's request.

Sholmès returned in two more stories collected in Volume 2, "Arsène Lupin versus Herlock Sholmes", and then in a guest-starring role in the battle for the secret of the Hollow Needle in L'Aiguille creuse. Arsène Lupin contre Herlock Sholmès was published in the United States in 1910 under the title "The Blonde Lady" which used the name "Holmlock Shears" for Sherlock Holmes, and "Wilson" for Watson. It is also stated in this book that Arsène Lupin is a vegetarian for "hygiene" reasons though he is not averse to eating meat to avoid being eccentric or stand out when in company while on the job.

=== Other Sherlock Holmes references ===
Sherlock Holmes, this time with his real name and accompanied by familiar characters such as Watson and Lestrade (all copyright protection having expired), also confronted Arsène Lupin in the 2008 PC 3D adventure game Sherlock Holmes Versus Arsène Lupin. In this game Holmes (and occasionally others) are attempting to stop Lupin from stealing five valuable British items. Lupin wants to steal the items in order to humble the "vanity" of England, but he also admires Holmes and thus challenges him to try to stop him.

In a novella The Prisoner of the Tower, or A Short But Beautiful Journey of Three Wise Men by Boris Akunin published in 2008 in Russia as the conclusion of "Jade Rosary Beads" book, Sherlock Holmes and Erast Fandorin oppose Arsène Lupin on 31 December 1899.

Due to longstanding copyright issues related to the character of Sherlock Holmes with the estate of Sir Arthur Conan Doyle, the name "Herlock Sholmes" was used for the character of the same name in the international release of the video game series The Great Ace Attorney Chronicles (2015–2021) in honour of Leblanc, with the characters of John and Iris Watson having their surnames changed to "Wilson".

In the pastiche "Larsen Hupin dans les pas de Charles Kolms" (2021), the detective investigates at the same time as the gentleman thief.

In the pastiche The Further Adventures of Sherlock Holmes – The Gentleman Burglar (2024), Holmes and Lupin team up to solve intricate riddles and journey across France and beyond to uncover the long-lost treasure of the House of Bourbon.

== Works ==
While Leblanc authored many Lupin stories, there is no universally-defined 'canon' (as with Sherlock Holmes), in part because several of them were originally published as unrelated works, only retroactively including Lupin in later prints or collections. In addition, many of Lupin's later appearances tend to be cameos or other minimal roles, in stories that otherwise do not focus on him or his activities.

1. Arsène Lupin, Gentleman Burglar (Arsène Lupin, gentleman cambrioleur, 1907 coll., 9 novellas) (AKA: Exploits of Arsène Lupin, Extraordinary Adventures of Arsène Lupin)
2. Arsène Lupin vs. Herlock Sholmes (Arsène Lupin contre Herlock Sholmès, 1908 coll., 2 stories) (AKA: The Blonde Lady)
3. The Hollow Needle (L'Aiguille creuse, 1909, novel)
4. 813 (813, 1910, novel)
5. The Crystal Stopper (Le Bouchon de cristal, 1912, novel)
6. The Confessions of Arsène Lupin (Les Confidences d'Arsène Lupin, 1913 coll., 9 novellas; 10 in the English version)
7. The Teeth of The Tiger (Les Dents du tigre, 1914, novel) Published in English in 1914, but remained unpublished in French until 1920.
8. The Shell Shard (L'Éclat d'obus, 1916, novel) (AKA: Woman of Mystery) Not originally part of the Arsène Lupin series, Lupin was written into the story in the 1923 edition.
9. The Golden Triangle (Le Triangle d'or, 1918, novel) (AKA: The Return of Arsène Lupin)
10. The Island of Thirty Coffins (L’Île aux trente cercueils, 1919, novel) (AKA: The Secret of Sarek)
11. The Eight Strokes of The Clock (Les Huit Coups de l'horloge, 1922 coll., 8 novellas)
12. The Secret Tomb (Dorothée, Danseuse de Corde, 1923, novel). The main character Dorothée solves one of Arsène Lupin's four fabulous secrets.
13. The Countess of Cagliostro (La Comtesse de Cagliostro, 1924, novel) (AKA: Memoirs of Arsène Lupin) Published in English in 1925.
14. The Overcoat of Arsène Lupin (Le Pardessus d'Arsène Lupin, published in English in 1926) Novella first published in 1924 in France as La Dent d'Hercule Petitgris. Altered into a Lupin story and published in English as The Overcoat of Arsène Lupin in 1926 in The Popular Magazine
15. The Damsel With Green Eyes (La Demoiselle aux yeux verts, 1927, novel) (AKA: The Girl With the Green Eyes, Arsène Lupin, Super Sleuth)
16. A Tragedy In The Forest Of Morgues (L'Homme à la peau de bique, 1927, novella) (AKA: The Man with the Goatskin)
17. The Barnett & Co. Agency (L'Agence Barnett et Cie., 1928 coll., 8 novellas) (AKA: Jim Barnett Intervenes, Arsène Lupin Intervenes) The English edition includes The Bridge That Broke story, which was unpublished in France at the time.
18. The Mysterious Mansion (La Demeure mystérieuse, 1929, novel) (AKA: The Melamare Mystery)
19. The Emerald Cabochon (Le Cabochon d'émeraude (1930, novella)
20. The Barre-y-va Mystery (La Barre-y-va, 1931, novel)
21. The Woman With Two Smiles (La Femme aux deux sourires, 1933, novel) (AKA: The Double Smile)
22. Victor of the Vice Squad (Victor de la Brigade mondaine, 1933, novel) (AKA: The Return of Arsène Lupin)
23. The Revenge of The Countess of Cagliostro (La Cagliostro se venge, 1935, novel)
24. The Billions of Arsène Lupin (Les Milliards d'Arsène Lupin, 1939/1941, novel) - The official last book of the series, The Billions of Arsène Lupin, was serialised in 1939 and published posthumously as a book in 1941 - yet without the ninth chapter "The Safe" ("IX. Les coffres-forts"). This edition was later withdrawn at the request of Leblanc's son. In 2002, through the efforts of some Lupinians and Korean translator Seong Gwi-Soo, the missing chapter was restored and the complete final Lupin novel published in Korea by Kachi Publishing House. A complete French e-book is now also available, as well as a printed edition by Editions Manucius (2015).
25. The Last Love of Arsène Lupin (Le Dernier Amour d'Arsène Lupin, novel), written around 1936 and posthumously published in 2012 after being found by chance in 2011 "on top of a cupboard in a beige shirt with rusty hooks" by Florence Boespflug-Leblanc.
26. Arsène Lupin Originally a 4-part play written by Maurice Leblanc and Francis de Croisset (1908), it was subsequently novelized by Edgar Jepson and published in 1909 by Doubleday as "Arsène Lupin: By Edgar Jepson"
27. An Adventure of Arsène Lupin fr:Une aventure d'Arsène Lupin (1911)
28. The Return of Arsène Lupin fr:Le Retour d'Arsène Lupin (théâtre) (1920) Written by Maurice Leblanc and Francis de Croisset.
29. This Woman is Mine (Cette femme est à moi, (1930)
30. A Quarter-hour with Arsène Lupin (Un quart d'heure avec Arsène Lupin, 1932)

=== Pastiches by other writers ===
- "Cingöz Recai: Arsen Lüpen İstanbul'da" by Peyami Safa, a book in a series with a Turkish recreation of Arsène Lupin (Cingöz Recai, or Recai the Shrewd) as the main character. In this book in the series, Arsène Lupin comes to Turkey and falls in love with a woman while there.
- "The Adventure of Mona Lisa" by Carolyn Wells in The Century (January, 1912), a short parody featuring an "International Society of Infallible Detectives" with Sherlock Holmes as the president and Arsène Lupin, The Thinking Machine, Monsieur Lecoq, A. J. Raffles, C. Auguste Dupin and Luther Trant as the other members.
- Sure Way to Catch Every Criminal. Ha! Ha! by Carolyn Wells in The Century (July, 1912)
- The Adventure of the Clothes-Line by Carolyn Wells in The Century (May, 1915)
- The Silver Hair Crime (= Clue?) by Nick Carter in New Magnet Library No. 1282 (1930)
- Ōgon-kamen (The Golden Mask) by Edogawa Rampo (1930). Here Rampo's recurring private sleuth Kogoro Akechi would match wits with Lupin, where the thief plays a central role as the Golden Mask.
- La Clé est sous le paillasson by Marcel Aymé (1934)
- Gaspard Zemba who appears in The Shadow Magazine (December 1, 1935) by Walter B. Gibson
- Arsène Lupin vs. Colonel Linnaus by Anthony Boucher in Ellery Queen's Mystery Magazine Vo. 5, No. 19 (1944)
- L’Affaire Oliveira by Thomas Narcejac in Confidences dans ma nuit (1946)
- Le Gentleman en Noir by Claude Ferny (c. 1950) (two novels)
- International Investigators, Inc. by Edward G. Ashton in Ellery Queen's Mystery Magazine (February 1952)
- Le Secret des rois de France ou La Véritable identité d’Arsène Lupin by Valère Catogan (1955)
- In Compartment 813 by Arthur Porges in Ellery Queen's Mystery Magazine (June 1966)
- Authorized sequels by the writing duo Boileau-Narcejac:
  - Le Secret d’Eunerville (1973)
  - La Poudrière (1974)
  - Le Second visage d’Arsène Lupin (1975)
  - La Justice d’Arsène Lupin (1977)
  - Le Serment d’Arsène Lupin (1979)
- Arsène Lupin, gentleman de la nuit by Jean-Claude Lamy (1983)
- Various stories in the Tales of the Shadowmen anthology series, ed. by Jean-Marc Lofficier and Randy Lofficier, Black Coat Press (2005-ongoing)
- Případ Grendwal (A Grendwal Case), a play by Pavel Dostál, Czech playwright and Minister of Culture
- Arsène Lupin et le mystère d'Arsonval by Michel Zink
- Qui fait peur à Virginia Woolf ? (... Élémentaire mon cher Lupin !) by Gabriel Thoveron
- Crimes parfaits by Christian Poslaniec
- La Dent de Jane by Daniel Salmon (2001)
- Les Lupins de Vincent by Caroline Cayol et Didier Cayol (2006)
- The Prisoner of the Tower, or A Short But Beautiful Journey of Three Wise Men (Узница башни, или Краткий, но прекрасный путь трёх мудрых) by Boris Akunin in a selection of stories The Jade Beads (Нефритовые чётки) (2006, in Russian). Arsène Lupin appears in this novella with Sherlock Holmes, Dr. Watson, and Akunin's own characters Erast Fandorin and Masa, the Japanese. The story is dedicated to Sir Arthur Conan Doyle and Maurice Leblanc.
- L'Église creuse by Patrick Genevaux (2009) (short story)
- The Many Faces of Arsène Lupin collection of short stories edited by Jean-Marc Lofficier & Randy Lofficier (Black Coat Press, 2012)
- Undead Girl Murder Farce by Yugo Aosaki (2015–present), where he appears as a minor antagonist alongside The Phantom during the second arc of the light novel series.
- Sherlock, Lupin et Moi, a children's book series written by Italian author Alessandro Gatti, where Irene Adler tells the adventures that she, Sherlock Holmes and Arsène Lupin had when they were kids. The books are written under the pseudonym Irene Adler. Twelve books have been published so far: Le Mystère de la Dame en Noir, Dernier Acte à l'Opéra, L'Énigme de la Rose Écarlate, La Cathédrale de la Peur, LeChâteau de Glace, Les Ombres de la Seine, L'Énigme du Cobra Royal, Le Secret de L'Oeil d'Horus, Partie de Chase Mortelle, Le Seigneur du Crime, Le Port des Ténèbres, Le Bateau des Adieux.
- The Further Adventures of Sherlock Holmes – The Gentleman Burglar by Sam Siciliano (Titan Books, 2024), Holmes and Lupin team up to solve intricate riddles and journey across France and beyond to uncover the long-lost treasure of the House of Bourbon.

== Derivatives ==
=== France ===
- Code Lupin by Michel Bussi (2006), a novel in which the books featuring Arsène Lupin hide a code, which the present-day protagonist Professor Bergton and his student assistant must solve in a tour of the province of Normandie.
- Lupin, a 2021 French television series produced by Netflix, stars Omar Sy as Assane Diop, a professional thief inspired by Arsène Lupin who seeks revenge on a wealthy family who framed his father for a crime he did not commit.

=== Japan ===
- The 1967 manga series Lupin III, written and illustrated by Monkey Punch, follows the escapades of master thief Lupin III, who is the grandson of Arsène Lupin. It went on to become a popular media franchise (see: Lupin the Third), including numerous manga, animated television series, theatrical films, television specials, OVA and ONA works, and multiple video games.
- The 2014 film Kamen Rider × Kamen Rider Drive & Gaim: Movie War Full Throttle features a character based on Lupin named Kamen Rider Lupin.
- The 2018 television show Kaitou Sentai Lupinranger VS Keisatsu Sentai Patranger features numerous references to Arsène Lupin, including "gentleman thief"-themed Super Sentai, an intro that mentions Lupin by name, and a plot that involves recovering artifacts once belonging to him.

=== United States ===
- Don Rosa introduced a character Arpin Lusène, in his Donald Duck comics based on Arsène Lupin. The character's name is a Spoonerism transposing the last syllables of "Arsene Lupin".
- Jean Le Flambeur, the protagonist of the science fiction novel The Quantum Thief, is based on Lupin. In the series, he sometimes goes by the pseudonym "Paul Sernine", an anagram for Arsene Lupin.

== In other media ==
=== Comics ===
- Arsène Lupin, written by Georges Cheylard, art by Bourdin. Daily strip published in France-Soir in 1948–49.
- Arsène Lupin, written & drawn by Jacques Blondeau. 575 daily strips published in Le Parisien Libéré from 1956 to 1958.
- Arsène Lupin contre Herlock Sholmès: La Dame blonde, written by Joëlle Gilles, art by Gilles & B. Cado, published by the authors, 1983.
- Arsène Lupin, written by André-Paul Duchateau, artist Géron, published by C. Lefrancq.
  1. Le Bouchon de cristal (1989)
  2. 813 — La Double Vie d'Arsène Lupin (1990)
  3. 813 — Les Trois crimes d'Arsène Lupin (1991)
  4. La Demoiselle aux yeux verts (1992)
  5. L'Aiguille creuse (1994)
- In Alan Moore's The League of Extraordinary Gentlemen: Black Dossier, Lupin is featured as a member of Les Hommes Mysterieux, the French analogue of Britain's League of Extraordinary Gentlemen.
- The manga series Soul Eater features a thief character named Lupin in chapter three, which is a reference to Arsène Lupin
- There is a manga adaptation of Arsène Lupin first published in 2011 titled Arsène Lupin, l'Aventurier from Gundam artist Takashi Morita
- The manga series MeiTanTei Konan features a thief character named Kaito Kuroba, who imitates Arsène Lupin while carrying out his exploits.

=== Films ===
- The Gentleman Burglar (B&W., US, 1908) with William Ranows (Lupin)
- Arsène Lupin with Georges Tréville (Lupin) and Harry Baur
- Arsène Lupin contra Sherlock Holmes (B&W., Germany, 1910) with Paul Otto (Lupin)
- Arsène Lupin contre Ganimard (B&W., France, 1914) with Georges Tréville (Lupin)
- The Gentleman Burglar (B&W., US, 1915) with William Stowell (Lupin)
- Arsène Lupin (B&W., UK, 1916) with Gerald Ames (Lupin)
- Arsène Lupin (B&W., US, 1917) with Earle Williams (Lupin)
- The Teeth of the Tiger (B&W., US, 1919) with David Powell (Lupin)
- 813 (B&W., US, 1920) with Wedgwood Nowell (Lupin) and Wallace Beery
- Les Dernières aventures d'Arsène Lupin (B&W., France/Hungary, 1921)
- 813 - Rupimono (B&W., Japan, 1923) with Minami Mitsuaki (Lupin)
- Arsène Lupin (B&W., US, 1932) with John Barrymore (Lupin)
- Arsene Lupin, Detective (Arsène Lupin détective, B&W., France, 1937) with Jules Berry (Lupin)
- Arsène Lupin Returns (B&W., US, 1938) with Melvyn Douglas (Lupin)
- Enter Arsène Lupin (B&W., US, 1944) with Charles Korvin (Lupin)
- Arsène Lupin (B&W., Mexico, 1947) with Ramón Pereda (Lupin)
- Nanatsu-no Houseki (B&W., Japan, 1950) with Keiji Sada (Lupin)
- Tora no-Kiba (B&W., Japan, 1951) with Ken Uehara (Lupin)
- Kao-no Nai Otoko (B&W., Japan, 1955) with Eiji Okada (Lupin)
- The Adventures of Arsène Lupin (Les Aventures d'Arsène Lupin, col., France, 1957) with Robert Lamoureux (Lupin)
- Signé Arsène Lupin (B&W., France, 1959) with Robert Lamoureux (Lupin)
- Arsène Lupin Versus Arsène Lupin (B&W., France, 1962) with Jean-Pierre Cassel and Jean-Claude Brialy (Lupins)
- Kaitō Lupin: 813 no Nazo (col., Japan, 1979) with Katsuo Nakamura (Lupin)
- Lupin tai Holmes (col., Japan, 1981) with Taichirou Hirokawa (Lupin)
- Arsène Lupin (col., France, 2004) with Romain Duris (Lupin)
- Lupin no Kiganjo (col., Japan, 2011) with Kōichi Yamadera (Lupin)
- Snowblind (col., Italy, 2023) with Luca Luongo (Lupin)
- Backfire (col., Italy, 2025) with Luca Luongo (Lupin)

=== Radio ===
- Les aventures d'Arsène Lupin, The 51-episode radio series directed by French-Algerian TV producer and filmmaker Abdel Isker, presented by Maurice Renault and Raymond Marcillac between 12 May 1960 and 15 July 1961, with the voices of Michel Roux, Louis Ducreux, Robert Marcy, and Yves Brainville

=== Television ===
- Arsène Lupin, 26 60-minute episodes (1971, 1973–1974) with Georges Descrières (Lupin)
- L'Île aux trente cercueils, six 60-minute episodes (1979) The character of Lupin, who only appears at the end of the novel, was removed entirely.
- Arsène Lupin joue et perd, six 52-minute episodes (1980) loosely based on 813 with Jean-Claude Brialy (Lupin)
- Le Retour d'Arsène Lupin, twelve 90-minute episodes (1989–1990) and Les Nouveaux Exploits d'Arsène Lupin, eight 90-minute episodes (1995–1996) with François Dunoyer (Lupin)
- Les Exploits d'Arsène Lupin (also known as Night Hood), 26 episodes for 24 min. (1996), produced by Cinar & France-Animation, with Luis de Cespedes (Lupin)
- Lupin, Philippine series (2007) with Richard Gutierrez (Lupin)
- Code: Realize ~Guardian of Rebirth~, anime television series (2017) based on the video game, produced by the studio M.S.C, with Tomoaki Maeno and J. Michael Tatum (Lupin in Japanese and English, respectively)
- The 2018 42nd Season Super Sentai series Kaitou Sentai Lupinranger VS Keisatsu Sentai Patranger features two teams, one of which is the Lupinrangers. Consisting of three members, they are recruited by Kogure, Arsène's butler, and executor of Arsène Lupin's will, to retrieve the Lupin Collection, Arsène's personal collection of the most dangerous artifacts he ever stole, with the understanding that if they collect them all, they will be granted a single wish, to retrieve the people they care most about from the clutches of the Gangler. Later on they are joined by part-time Phantom Thief Noel Takao, the adopted son of Arsène Lupin, who seeks to destroy the Don of the Gangler, and bring together all the pieces of the collection to bring his father back, since when the Ganglers broke in they murdered Arsène and stole most of the pieces.
- The 2019 Girls × Heroine Series Secret × Heroine Phantomirage! features playing card suits and phantom thief which is the Phantomirage's main motifs.
- 2021's French TV series Lupin starring Omar Sy as Assane Diop, who is influenced to commit crimes based on the Leblanc stories after his father is framed and imprisoned.
- Lupin is a supporting character in the 2022 original net animation Lupin Zero, a part of the Lupin III franchise (see the Japan subsection of "Derivatives"). Lupin I is alive in the 1960s due to constant organ transplants (which are gained through murder), and his protagonist grandson rebels against him in order to make his own destiny.

=== Theatre ===
- Arsène Lupin by Francis de Croisset and Maurice Leblanc. Four-act play first performed on October 28, 1908, at the Athenée in Paris. In 1909 it had successful runs in New York and London, with the London production running for 199 shows. In New York it played for 144 performances before touring; the New York cast included William Courtenay as Lupin, Doris Keane, and Sidney Herbert.
- Arsène Lupin contre Herlock Sholmès by Victor Darlay & Henry de Gorsse. Four-act play first performed on October 10, 1910, at the Théâtre du Châtelet in Paris. (American edition ISBN 1-932983-16-3)
- Le Retour d'Arsène Lupin by Francis de Croisset and Maurice Leblanc. One-act play first performed on September 16, 1911, at the Théâtre de la Cigale in Paris.
- Arsène Lupin, Banquier by Yves Mirande & Albert Willemetz, libretto by Marcel Lattès. Three-act operetta, first performed on May 7, 1930, at the Théâtre des Bouffes Parisiennes in Paris.
- A/L The Youth of Phantom Thief Lupin by Yoshimasa Saitou . Takarazuka Revue performance, 2007, starring Yūga Yamato and Hana Hizuki.
- Rupan －ARSÈNE LUPIN－ by Haruhiko Masatsuka . Takarazuka Revue performance, 2013, starring Masaki Ryū and Reika Manaki (after Le Dernier Amour d'Arsène Lupin)

=== Video games ===
- Sherlock Holmes Versus Arsène Lupin (known in North America and some parts of England as Sherlock Holmes: Nemesis) is an adventure game for Windows-compatible computers. It was developed by the game development studio Frogwares, and released in October, 2007. The game follows Holmes and Watson as Holmes is challenged by the legendary gentleman thief Arsène Lupin, who threatens to steal England's most-prized treasures.
- Persona 5 features beings known as Personas that are the manifestation of their owners' rebellious spirit and are inspired by fictional characters, historical figures and mythological beings. The protagonist utilizes Arsène as his initial persona and also resides in the attic of a café named Leblanc, a reference to Maurice Leblanc. Similarly to Arsène, the protagonist is also a phantom thief who fights for good on the wrong side of the law. His rival is the detective Goro Akechi, bearing a similar name to the sleuth who clashed against Arsène Lupin. In Royal, new Personas are available for the main cast, and the protagonist gains access to a different version of the Arsène Persona (through DLC) named Raoul, based on one of Lupin's most common aliases.

== See also ==
- Le Clos Arsène Lupin, Maison Maurice Leblanc
- Marius Jacob
- Flambeau, a similar character
