= Je sais tout =

French magazine

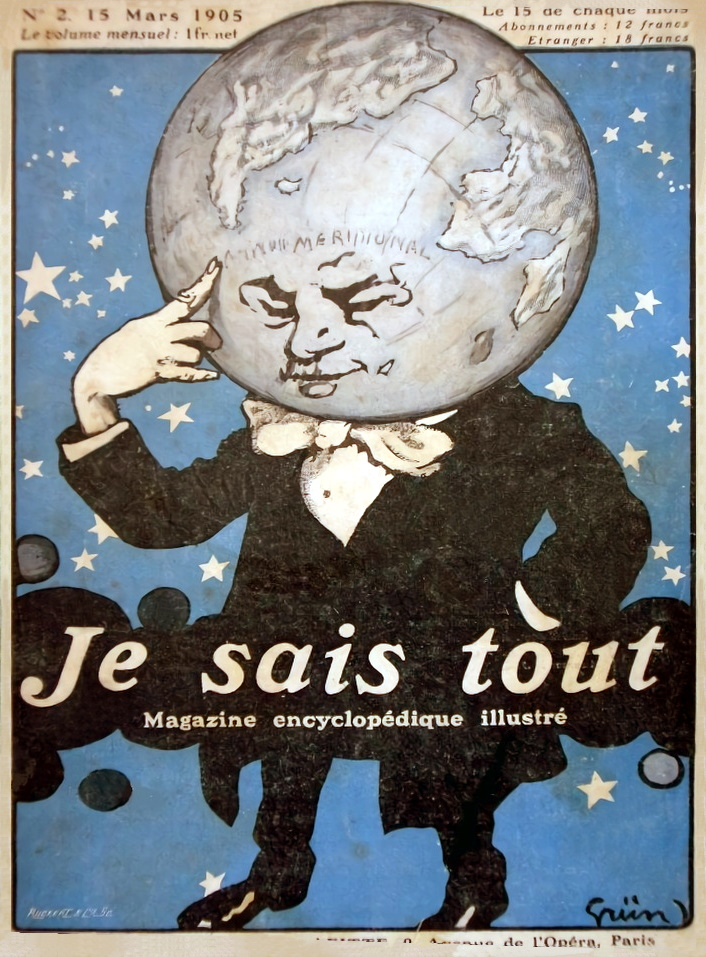
- N° 2, 15 March 1905 cover by Grün.
- Editor: Pierre Lafitte (1905–1921)
- Frequency: Monthly
- Publisher: Société générale d'éditions illustrées
- Founder: Pierre Lafitte
- First issue: February 15, 1905; 121 years ago
- Final issue: September 1, 1939; 87 years ago
- Country: France
- Language: French
- ISSN: 0982-1678

Je sais tout (meaning I Know All in English) was a French magazine established by Pierre Lafitte in 1905. It was noted for featuring the works of Maurice Leblanc, in particular the adventures of Arsène Lupin, which was first published in 1905.

Je sais tout was a popular science magazine. The magazine appeared on the 15th day of each month, but publication was interrupted from August 1914 to the end of 1914. The magazine's format was usually 17.5 cm by 24.5 cm, and contained more than 100 pages. The magazine's logo was created by Jules-Alexandre Grün. Initial circulation figures were estimated to be about 250,000. The headquarters of the magazine was in Paris.

Je sais tout was published in its original form until 15 January 1922, when it was reformed as Je sais tout, la revue de la découverte (meaning I Know All, Review of Discovery in English), and was published on the 1st of the month instead. The last issue of the new format, and thus Je sais tout overall, was released on 1 September 1939.

== The Arsène Lupin adventures ==
- Arsène Lupin, Gentleman Burglar, published in 9 parts in issues 6, 11, 12, 13, 15, 16, 17, 18 et 28, from July 1905 to May 1907
- Arsène Lupin vs. Herlock Sholmes, published in 2 parts from November 1906 to October 1907
- The Hollow Needle, published from November 1908 to May 1909
- The Confessions of Arsene Lupin, published in 9 parts from April 1911 to June 1913
