= The Hollow Needle =

1909 novel by Maurice Leblanc

The Hollow Needle (French: L'Aiguille creuse)
- Author: Maurice Leblanc
- Translator: Alexander Teixeira de Mattos
- Language: French
- Genre: Crime fiction
- Publication date: 1909
- Publication place: France
- Media type: Print
- Preceded by: The Hollow Needle
- Followed by: 813

The Hollow Needle is a novel by Maurice Leblanc featuring the adventures of the gentleman thief, Arsène Lupin. As with the preceding two volumes of the Arsène Lupin stories, this was first serialized in the French magazine Je sais tout from November 1908 to May 1909. The novel was released, with a few modifications, in June 1909.

== Plot summary ==
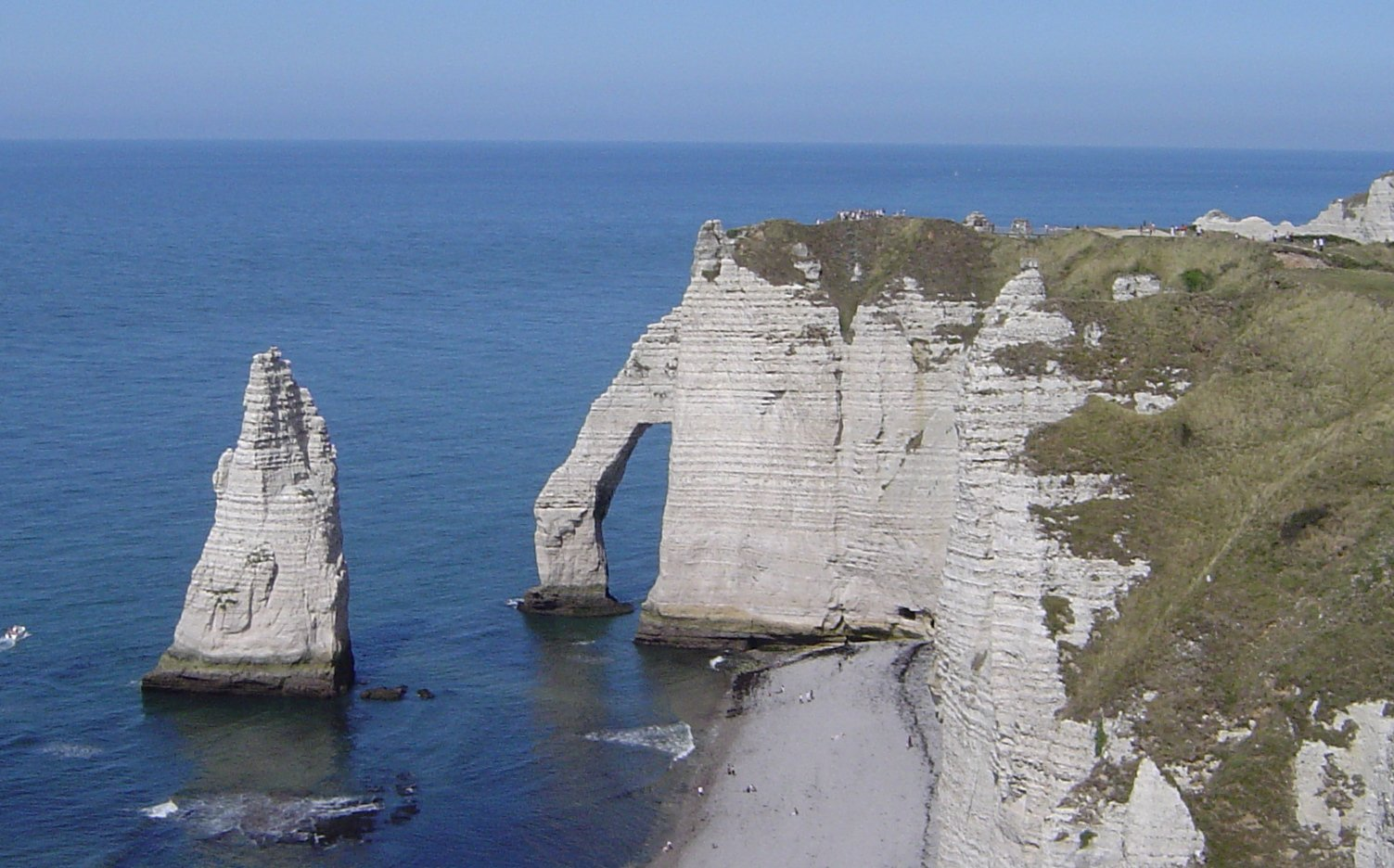
The Needle of Étretat

Arsène Lupin is opposed this time by Isidore Beautrelet, a young but gifted amateur detective, who is still in high school but who is poised to give Arsène Lupin a big headache. In the Arsène Lupin universe, the Hollow Needle is the second secret of Marie Antoinette and Alessandro Cagliostro, the hidden fortune of the kings of France, as revealed to Arsène Lupin by Josephine Balsamo in the novel The Countess of Cagliostro (1924). The Mystery of the Hollow Needle hides a secret that the Kings of France have been handing down since the time of Julius Caesar... and now Arsène Lupin has mastered it. The legendary needle contains the most fabulous treasure ever imagined, a collection of queens' dowries, pearls, rubies, sapphires and diamonds... the fortune of the kings of France.

When Isidore Beautrelet discovers the Château de l'Aiguille in the department of Creuse, he thinks that he has found the solution to the riddle ("l'Aiguille Creuse" being French for "The Hollow Needle", and also the French title of the novel). However, he did not realize that the château was built by Louis XIV, the king of France, to put people off the track of a needle in Normandy, near the town of Le Havre, where Arsène Lupin, known also under the name of Louis Valméras, has hidden himself.

== Sequels ==
A direct sequel to this novel, featuring Lupin against La Griffe, is the novel Le second visage d'Arsène Lupin by Boileau-Narcejac in 1975.

== In the popular media ==
In January 2021, Netflix began streaming the Lupin (TV series) of five episodes; they take place in current times and feature fictional master thief Assane Diop. According to Rolling Stone (magazine), "both the show and the character of Assane take their inspiration from Arsène Lupin ... [the main character is given] a Lupin novel at a formative age, and Assane treats the Lupin stories as his own personal Bible [while performing] "spectacular crimes". The fifth episode of the series was filmed in and around the commune of Étretat where Maurice Leblanc owned a home which is now the Clos Lupin Museum.

== Principal characters ==
- Isidore Beautrelet, the boy detective
- Mademoiselle Raymonde
- Arsène Lupin
- Examining magistrate Filleul
- Ganimard, a French police detective
- Louis Valméras
- The Count of Gesvres
- Holmlock Shears
