= Arsène Lupin, Gentleman Burglar =

Short story collection

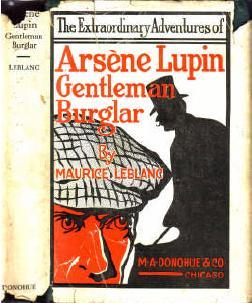
- Cover of the first American edition
- Author: Maurice Leblanc
- Original title: Arsène Lupin, gentleman-cambrioleur
- Translator: Alexander Teixeira de Mattos
- Cover artist: Henri Goussé
- Language: French
- Series: Arsène Lupin
- Genre: Crime novel
- Publication date: 10 June 1907
- Publication place: France
- Followed by: Arsène Lupin versus Herlock Sholmes

Arsène Lupin, Gentleman Burglar (French: Arsène Lupin, gentleman-cambrioleur), also released as The Extraordinary Adventures of Arsène Lupin, Gentleman-Burglar, is the first collection of stories by Maurice Leblanc recounting the adventures of Arsène Lupin, released on 10 June 1907. It contains the first nine stories depicting the character, first published in the French magazine Je sais tout, the first one being on 15 July 1905. The seventh features English detective Sherlock Holmes, changed in subsequent publications to "Herlock Sholmes" after protests from Arthur Conan Doyle's lawyers, as seen in the second collection Arsène Lupin versus Herlock Sholmes.

== Chapters ==
1. "The Arrest of Arsène Lupin" ("L'Arrestation d'Arsène Lupin") Je sais tout, No. 6, 15 July 1905): During a trip to America, it is learned that famous thief Arsène Lupin has made it aboard the ship. The ship's guests, led by Bernard d'Andrèzy, try to weed out the thief with only a partial description of his appearance and the first letter of the alias he is using. A woman's jewels are stolen and d'Andrèzy courts wealthy shipmate Miss Nelly. Inspector Ganimard, an expert on Lupin, is at the ships' destination waiting, and successfully arrests d'Andrèzy - who is really Lupin. The jewels, hidden in d'Andrèzy's camera, are knowingly dropped into the water by the now scornful yet still protective Miss Nelly to eliminate the evidence.
2. "Arsène Lupin in Prison" ("Arsène Lupin en prison") Je sais tout, No. 11, 15 December 1905, as "The Extraordinary Life of Arsène Lupin in Prison"): Baron Nathan Cahorn receives a letter from Arsène Lupin, who is incarcerated in La Santé Prison, wherein the thief tells Cahorn to send him several of his valuables or else he will come on 27 September to steal those named and more. Cahorn seeks out detective Ganimard, who happens to be on vacation in town, and hires him and two of his men to guard the belongings on the announced date. When the crime occurs, Ganimard asks Cahorn not to tell people he was there and an official investigation is launched, during which Ganimard is called in as the expert on the thief. Ganimard goes to see Lupin in prison, where the thief explains that the Ganimard hired by Cahorn was in reality an imposter, orchestrated by Lupin. Lupin also states that he was only arrested because he was distracted by a woman he loved and declares that he will not be present at his own trial.
3. "The Escape of Arsène Lupin" ("L'Évasion d'Arsène Lupin") Je sais tout, No. 12, 15 January 1906, as "The Extraordinary Life of Arsène Lupin: The Escape of Arsene Lupin"): Having learned that Arsène Lupin plans to escape before his trial, the police allow it to happen while secretly watching him in order to arrest his accomplices. However, after a meal, Lupin simply returns to prison, having known he was being tailed already. During the trial Ganimard is convinced that the charged man is not Lupin, but a lookalike. The lookalike had been arrested and released on the same day that Lupin willingly returned to prison. When the lookalike is released, Ganimard tails him only to confront him and realize it was Lupin all along. The thief reveals he made himself look like an imposter through dieting and certain drug injections, and that his colleagues had the actual lookalike arrested that day on purpose.
4. "The Mysterious Traveller" ("Le Mystérieux voyageur") Je sais tout, No. 13, 15 February 1906, as "The Extraordinary Life of Arsene Lupin: The Mysterious Traveler"): A disguised Lupin takes a train to Rouen, and is joined in his carriage by a nervous woman, Madame Renaud, and a mysterious man, whom Renaud assumes to be Lupin. The man suddenly attacks and binds Lupin, steals the pair's belongings, and escapes the train as it slows when approaching a section of track under repair. When the police board, Renaud reports the theft, however Lupin decides not to use the opportunity to escape and instead plans to get even with the robber. He advises the police on capturing "Lupin", and tracks him to a wooded area. Knocking the thief out, he recognises him as a serial murderer, and signals the police before escaping, leaving behind a calling card and Madame Renaud's purse - though fails to resist taking a few of her belongings for himself.
5. "The Queen's Necklace" ("Le Collier de la reine") Je sais tout, No. 15, 15 April 1906, as "The Extraordinary Life of Arsene Lupin: The Queen's Necklace"): A valuable diamond necklace originally created for Marie Antoinette is stolen from the moderately wealthy Drex-Soubise family. The only suspect is their downtrodden friend and houseguest Henriette, though the police and Drex-Soubise's find this unlikely. The case goes unsolved, and Henriette receives regular anonymous letters filled with money until her death. Six years later at a party, the Drex-Soubise and their guests theorise on the crime, with one guest - Cavaliere Floriani - plotting out the crime in great detail to the stunned group. He concludes that it was Henriette's young son Raoul who committed the crime, with the implication that Floriani is both a disguised Lupin, and Raoul himself. The Drex-Soubise explain that though the necklace isn't worth much without the diamonds, it contains great sentimental value to their family; four days later the necklace is returned along with a note from Lupin himself.
6. "Seven of Hearts" ("Le Sept de cœur") Je sais tout, No. 28, 15 May 1907, as "How I Met Arsene Lupin: The Seven of Hearts"): The narrator returns home one night to find a note warning him to stay still and silent, as he hears the next room being ransacked. In the morning however, he finds nothing amiss, save a metal seven of hearts playing card with holes punched in. He reports the incident in his newspaper column, and is approached the next day by a mysterious man who asks to investigate his room, only for the man to shoot himself a few minutes later. The police discover a note linking the man to banker Georges Andermatt, who identifies the man as criminal Etienne Varin. Two days later, a figure named Salvator writes a newspaper report linking Andermatt to Etienne, his brother Alfred Varin and missing inventor Louis Lacombe, who had developed a powerful weaponised submarine called the 'Seven-of-Hearts'. At dinner with his friend Daspry, the narrator is approached by Andermatt's wife, who implies she had an affair with Lacombe, revealing the Varin's have been blackmailing Andermatt with the incriminating love letters. Daspry becomes obsessed by the case, turning the narrator's house upside down, and eventually discovers Lacombe's skeleton buried in the garden, with another metal seven of hearts. The narrator suffers a breakdown, and after a few days of recovery, Daspry summons everyone to the narrator's house. Andermatt and Varin fight and almost come to blows, but are stopped by Daspry, who reveals himself as both Salvator, and Lupin. He explains that the house - formerly owned by Lacombe - was used as a hiding place by the Varin brothers, who killed Lacombe for his submarine plans. They used a secret vault Lacombe built into a mosaic, with the metal playing cards mapping out which tiles needed to be pushed to open the vault. Lupin had robbed the safe of its valuables on the first night, leading to Etienne Varin's suicide as he believed the submarine plans had been taken. However, it was only after Andermatt's wife told them of incriminating letters that Lupin realised there was a secret compartment within the vault, accessed by flipping the metal playing cards upside-down. He throws Varin out, and gives a set of forged letters to Andermatt, returning the real love letters to his wife. He hands the submarine plans over to the government and announces the death of the Daspry persona, but stays in contact with the narrator, resulting in said narrator becoming Lupin's unofficial biographer: the author of the Lupin stories.
7. "The Safe of Madame Imbert" ("Le Coffre-fort de madame Imbert") Je sais tout, No. 16, 15 May 1906, as "The Extraordinary Life of Arsene Lupin: The Safe of Madame Imbert"): Five years ago, a young Lupin saved wealthy hotelier Ludovic Imbert from a fake mugging, planned by himself and an accomplice. The grateful Imbert and his wife took Lupin in as an assistant in their hotel - part of Lupin’s plan to steal millions from their safe. During his time working under them, Lupin was puzzled by the other staff's avoidance of him, and the confusing financial actions of the Imberts. After a week, Lupin and his accomplice attacked Ludovic and stole the files. In the present day, Lupin’s biographer questions whether he feels remorseful: A furious Lupin reveals that the files were all forgeries; the Imberts had pretended Lupin was a millionaire named Andrew Rawford in order to take out loans in his name, and let him steal the fake documents to be rid of the evidence. Lupin considers the affair his first true lesson in burglary, and laughs with his biographer when he admits that Madame Imbert had even tricked him into gifting her 1,500 francs.
8. "The Black Pearl" ("La Perle noire") Je sais tout, No. 18, 15 July 1906, as "The Extraordinary Life of Arsene Lupin: The Black Pearl"): Lupin breaks into the home of the famous Countess d'Andillot to steal a valuable black pearl in her possession, only to discover her murdered corpse. Six months later, her manservant Victor Danegre has been tried and acquitted of the crime. Whilst in hiding, Danegre is approached by Grimaudan, a retired detective, who describes the entire crime in detail and threatens to contact the police unless he is given the pearl. A terrified Danegre gives the pearl to Grimaudan - who is Lupin in disguise. In the present, Lupin explains his pride to his biographer: firstly for using the limited time after the crime to reconstruct it and deduce Danegre's guilt; and secondly for tricking Danegre into giving him the pearl: The law of Double jeopardy meant he was never in danger of being re-arrested in the first place.
9. "Sherlock Holmes Arrives Too Late" ("Sherlock Holmès arrive trop tard") Je sais tout, No. 17, 15 June 1906, as "The Extraordinary Life of Arsene Lupin: Sherlock Holmes Arrives Too Late"): Lupin, disguised as a famous artist named Valmont, is invited to a party by the wealthy Monsieur Devanne. Devanne expects to be the next target of Lupin's thefts, however gloats about the upcoming arrival of the famous detective Sherlock Holmes to help prevent the crime, and willingly gives away several clues about how to enter his family's secret vault. Lupin and his accomplices raid the vault, however Lupin is unexpectedly interrupted by Miss Nelly, another guest at the party, and ashamedly promises to return the stolen belongings. The next day, Devanne receives a note with the location of the stolen items, and Lupin approaches Miss Nelly, who silently rebuffs him. Lupin woefully accepts. As he leaves, a disguised Lupin bumps into Holmes, and quickly flees. Holmes stays with Devanne, and swiftly solves the riddles Lupin used to find the hidden room. A car sent by Lupin arrives to collect the pair, with Holmes revealing he recognised Lupin the moment he saw him, and chose to let him escape. However, Holmes is shocked to also receive a package from Lupin, containing Holmes's own pickpocketed watch. A stern Holmes resolves to face Lupin again one day.
