= The Crystal Stopper =

1912 novel by Maurice Leblanc

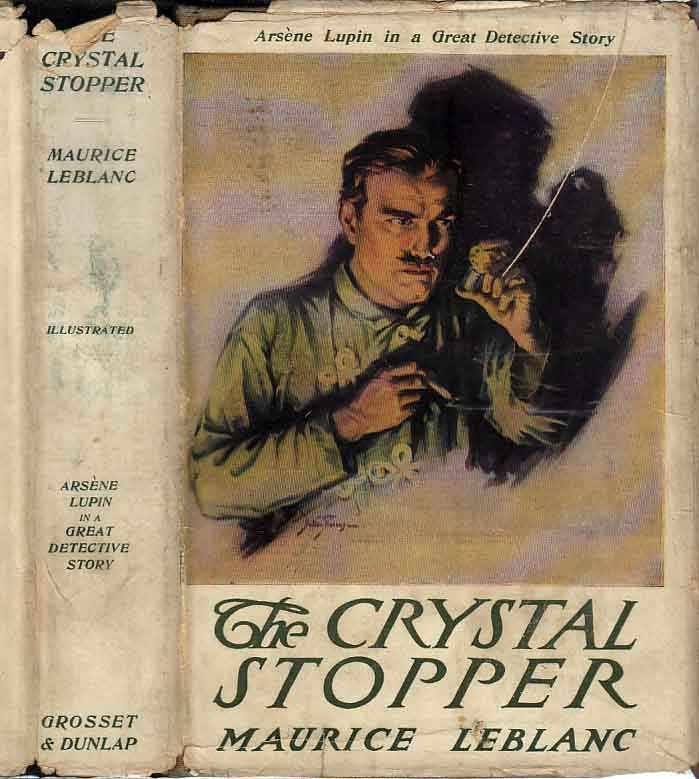
Dustjacket for The Crystal Stopper with illustration by Dalton Stevens

The Crystal Stopper is a mystery novel by Maurice Leblanc featuring the adventures of the gentleman thief Arsène Lupin. The novel appeared in serial form in the French newspaper Le Journal from September to November 1912 and was subsequently released as a novel in a single volume. Leblanc was inspired by the infamous Panama scandals of 1892 and 1893. The novel borrows from Edgar Allan Poe's short story "The Purloined Letter" the idea of hiding an object in plain sight.

== Plot summary ==
During a burglary at the home of Deputy Daubrecq a crime is committed and two accomplices of Arsène Lupin are arrested by the police. One is guilty of the crime, the other innocent but both will be sentenced to death. Lupin seeks to deliver the victim of a miscarriage of justice, but struggles against Deputy Daubrecq's ruthless blackmailer, who has an incriminating document hidden in a crystal stopper.
