= 813 (novel) =

1910 novel by Maurice Leblanc

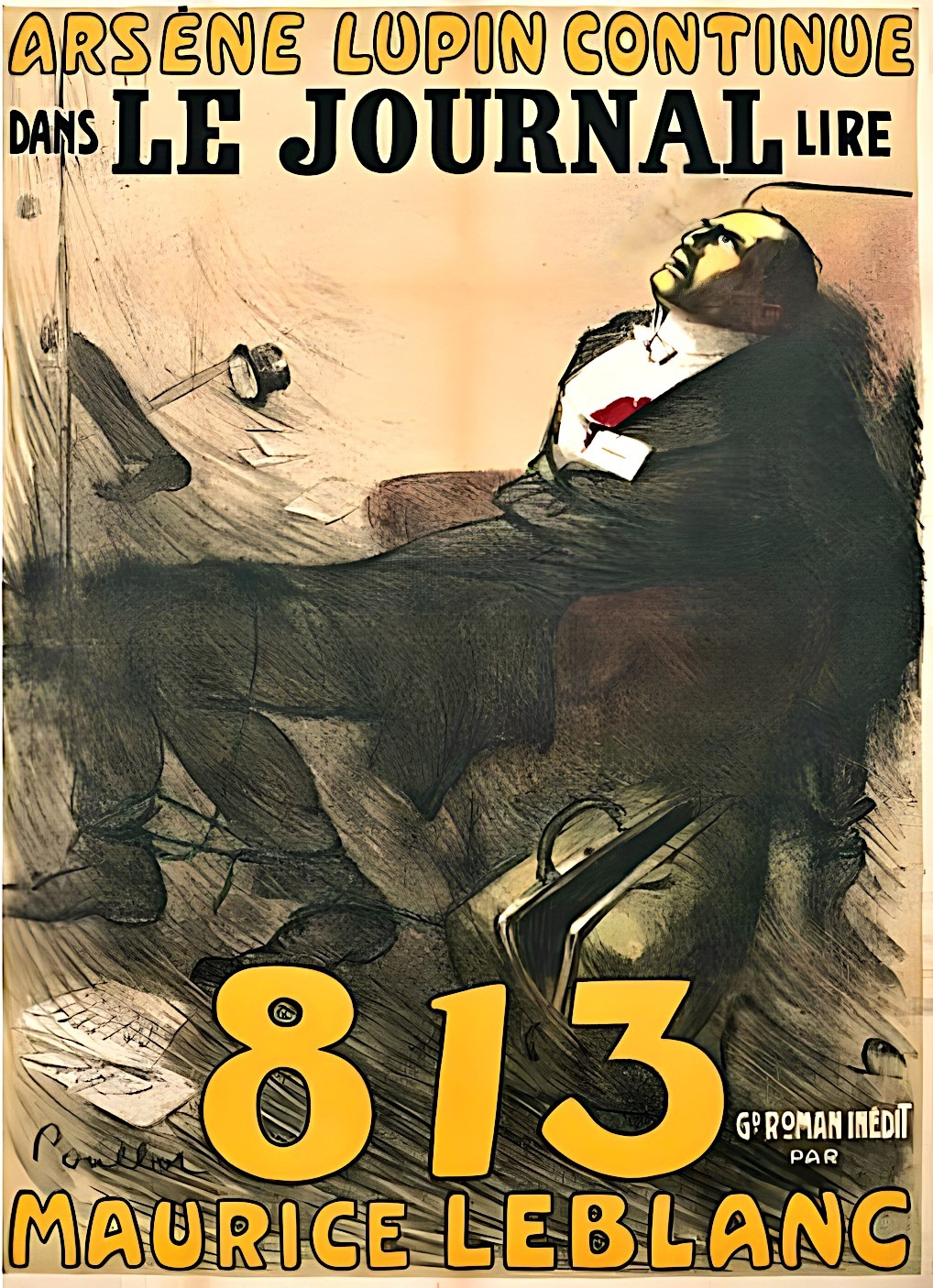
- The murder of Rudolph Kesselbach. Poulbot's advertising poster for the publication of the serial in the daily newspaper Le Journal.
- Author: Maurice Leblanc
- Language: French
- Publisher: Editions Pierre Lafitte
- Publication date: June 1910
- English publication date: March 1911

813 is a novel by Maurice Leblanc published in June 1910. It features the adventures of gentleman-thief Arsène Lupin. It was published in March 1911 in English by Doubleday.

== Plot ==
A wealthy South African diamond dealer, Mr. Rudolf Kesselbach, is robbed and murdered. The crime was apparently committed by Arsène Lupin since his bloody card was found pinned to the deceased.

Despite the presence of the police and the head of the Sûreté M. Lenormand, two new murders were committed: the servant Gustave and Chapman, M. Kesselbach's secretary. The only clues the police discovered: a cigarette case marked with the initials "L. M." and a small label bearing the number "813".

== Production ==
Unlike the previous volumes of Arsène Lupin's stories, which had appeared in serial form in Je sais tout, it was published in the daily newspaper Le Journal, one of the most important of the time, from March 5 to May 24, 1910.

In June 1910, Lafitte published a largely truncated text in a thick volume of 500 pages; missing in particular are the arrest of Lupin by Lenormand, the idyll between Geneviève and Marcel Landat, the Steeple Course and the pickpockets, the murder of Gertrude, etc. (Was it at the request of the publisher that the text was reduced to 500 pages?) It is this truncated text that will serve as the basis for subsequent versions. These cuts introduce some minor inconsistencies; for example, at the beginning of the novel, Lupin who is unaware that his second-in-command, Gourel, is due to arrive, or, as Lupin himself says in the original text: "This individual, showing an insensitivity that I point out to honest people, has usurped my name, has made use of my methods and has compromised me by his clumsiness and by the culpable levity with which he delivered to the dagger of the assassin the one he had the honor of robbing".

This novel was republished in 1917 in two volumes entitled 813 and The Three Crimes of Arsène Lupin. The text was modified to accentuate the anti-German aspect, as the First World War was in progress. The first volume will then be found under the title The Double Life of Arsène Lupin.

== Particularity of the novel ==
The tone of this novel is quite different from the first three: we are dealing with a complex, disturbing Arsène Lupin, whose objective is nothing more and nothing less than to dominate Europe. 813 also contains a fairly large number of violent deaths, and a formidable, invisible and particularly disturbing enemy, L.M.

== Adaptation ==
The novel was first adapted in the United States in 1920 in a film of the same name directed by Scott Sidney, and then again three years later in Japan by Kenji Mizoguchi under the title 813 - Rupimono.

813 was very faithfully adapted for television in 1980 under the title Arsène Lupin joue et perd. Due to a lack of audience success, this adaptation work did not have the follow-up that its initiators had envisaged.

It is in reference to this novel that the association of friends of detective literature was called 813 (association), especially since it is statutorily limited to 813 members.

== Sources ==
- Ruaud, André-François (September 25, 2008). Les Nombreuses Vies d'Arsène Lupin [The Many Lives of Arsène Lupin] (in French). Paris: Les Moutons électriques. ISBN 978-2-915793-59-8.
