= Maurice Leblanc =

French writer (1864–1941)

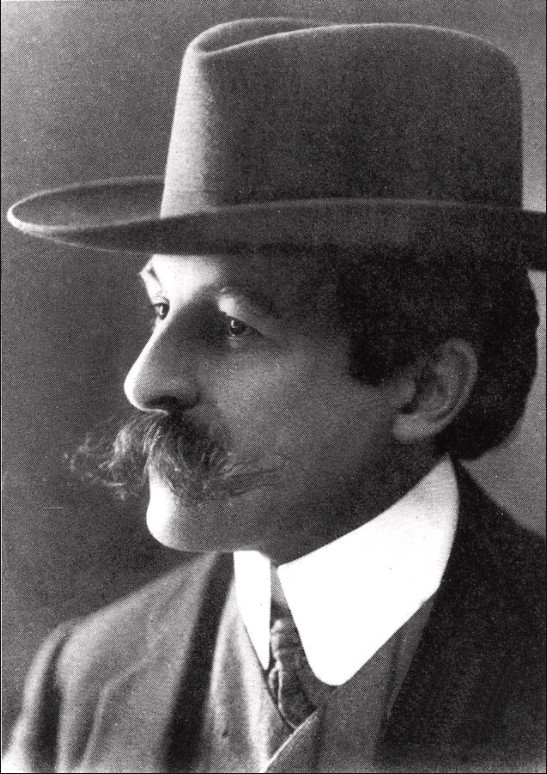
- Leblanc in 1907
- Born: Marie Émile Maurice Leblanc; 11 December 1864; Rouen, France
- Died: 6 November 1941 (aged 76); Perpignan, France
- Resting place: Saint-Martin cemetery in Perpignan (8 November 1941 – 11 October 1947); Montparnasse cemetery (since 14 October 1947)
- Education: Lycée Corneille (1875–1882)
- Occupation: Writer
- Spouses: Marie-Ernestine Flannel (1889–1895); Marguerite Wormser (after 1895, married 1906)
- Children: Louise Amélie Marie Leblanc (1889–1974)
- Relatives: Georgette Leblanc
- Writing career
- Years active: 1890–1941
- Genres: Detective fiction, science fiction, psychological novel
- Notable work: Arsène Lupin

Signature
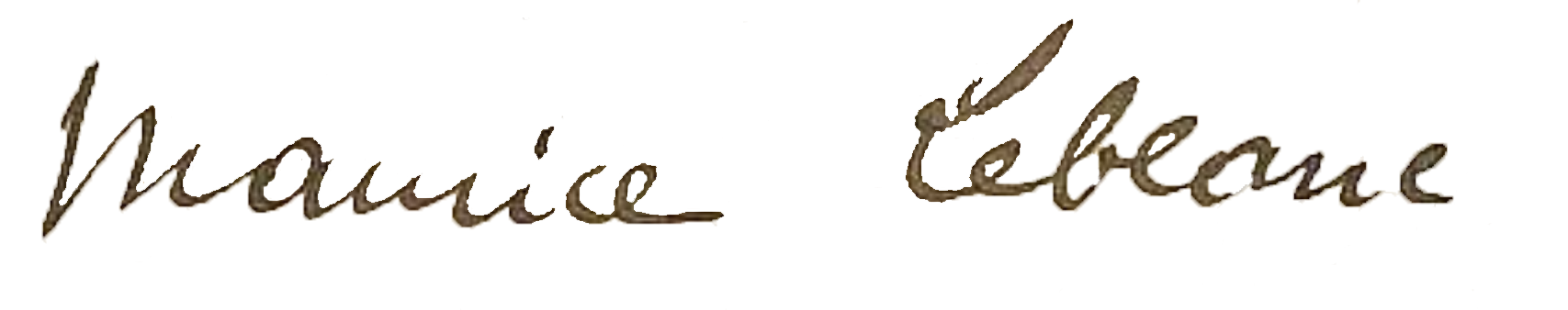

Maurice Marie Émile Leblanc (/ləˈblɑːn/; French: [ləblɑ̃]; 11 December 1864 – 6 November 1941) was a French novelist and writer of short stories, known primarily as the creator of the fictional gentleman thief and detective Arsène Lupin, often described as a French counterpart to Arthur Conan Doyle's creation Sherlock Holmes.

The first Arsène Lupin story appeared in a series of short stories that was serialized in the magazine Je sais tout, starting in No. 6, dated 15 July 1905. Clearly created at editorial request, it is possible that Leblanc had also read Octave Mirbeau's Les 21 jours d'un neurasthénique (1901), which features a gentleman thief named Arthur Lebeau, and he had seen Mirbeau's comedy Scrupules (1902), whose main character is a gentleman thief.

By 1907, Leblanc had graduated to writing full-length Lupin novels, and the reviews and sales were so good that Leblanc effectively dedicated the rest of his career to working on the Lupin stories. Like Conan Doyle, who often appeared embarrassed or hindered by the success of Sherlock Holmes and seemed to regard his success in the field of crime fiction as a detraction from his more "respectable" literary ambitions, Leblanc also appeared to have resented Lupin's success. Several times he tried to create other characters, such as private eye Jim Barnett, but he eventually merged them with Lupin. He continued to pen Lupin tales well into the 1930s.

Leblanc also wrote two notable science fiction novels: Les Trois Yeux (1919), in which a scientist makes televisual contact with three-eyed Venusians, and Le Formidable Evènement (1920), in which an earthquake creates a new landmass between England and France.

Leblanc was awarded the Légion d'Honneur for his services to literature, and died in Perpignan in 1941. He was buried in the Montparnasse Cemetery. Georgette Leblanc was his sister.

== Life ==
Maurice Leblanc was the second child of Émile Leblanc, 34-year-old ship-owner merchant, and of Mathilde Blanche (née Brohy) daughter of rich dyers, aged 21 and was delivered by Achille Flaubert, Gustave Flaubert's brother. He had an elder sister Jehanne (born in 1863) and a younger sister Georgette Leblanc (born in 1869) who from 1883 until the 1920s was an actor and star operatic soprano.

During the Franco-German War of 1870, his father sent Maurice to Scotland. Upon his return to France, he completed his studies in Rouen. The young Maurice received his first education in a free institution, the Patry pension. Then, from 1875 to 1882, completed his secondary studies at the Lycée Corneille. As a teenager, he frequently encountered Gustave Flaubert and Guy de Maupassant.

Refusing the career that his father intended for him at a card factory, Maurice instead headed to Paris in 1888, to pursue writing. First a journalist, then novelist and storyteller. His first novel, Une femme (A Woman), published in 1893 was very successful, and was followed by other works, such as Des couples (The Couples), Voici des ailes (Here are wings) and his only play, La pitié, released in 1902, which was a failure, causing him to give up the theater for a while. In 1901, he published L'Enthousiasme, an autobiographical novel.

In 1905, Pierre Lafitte, the director of the monthly Je sais tout, commissioned a short story from Leblanc, that was to be in the vein of A.J Raffles by Ernest William Hornung and the adventures of Sherlock Holmes. The resulting "L'Arrestation d'Arsène Lupin" (The Arrest of Arsène Lupin) proved to be a great public success. Two years later, the book Arsène Lupin, Gentleman Burglar was released, containing the first nine stories depicting the character that were published in the French magazine Je sais tout. By 1907, Doyle or his representatives had threatened legal action over the unauthorized use of the character, and Leblanc's following collection of stories was titled Arsène Lupin versus Herlock Sholmes.

Maurice Leblanc received the Legion of Honor on January 17, 1908, presented by then Under-Secretary of State for Fine Arts, Étienne Dujardin-Beaumetz. While a supporter of French radical socialists and free-thinker in his early age, Leblanc became more bourgeois around the time of the First World War. Leblanc would start to grow weary of writing Arsène Lupin stories. As early as 1910, he tried to kill his hero in the novel 813, but would resuscitate the character in The Crystal Stopper.

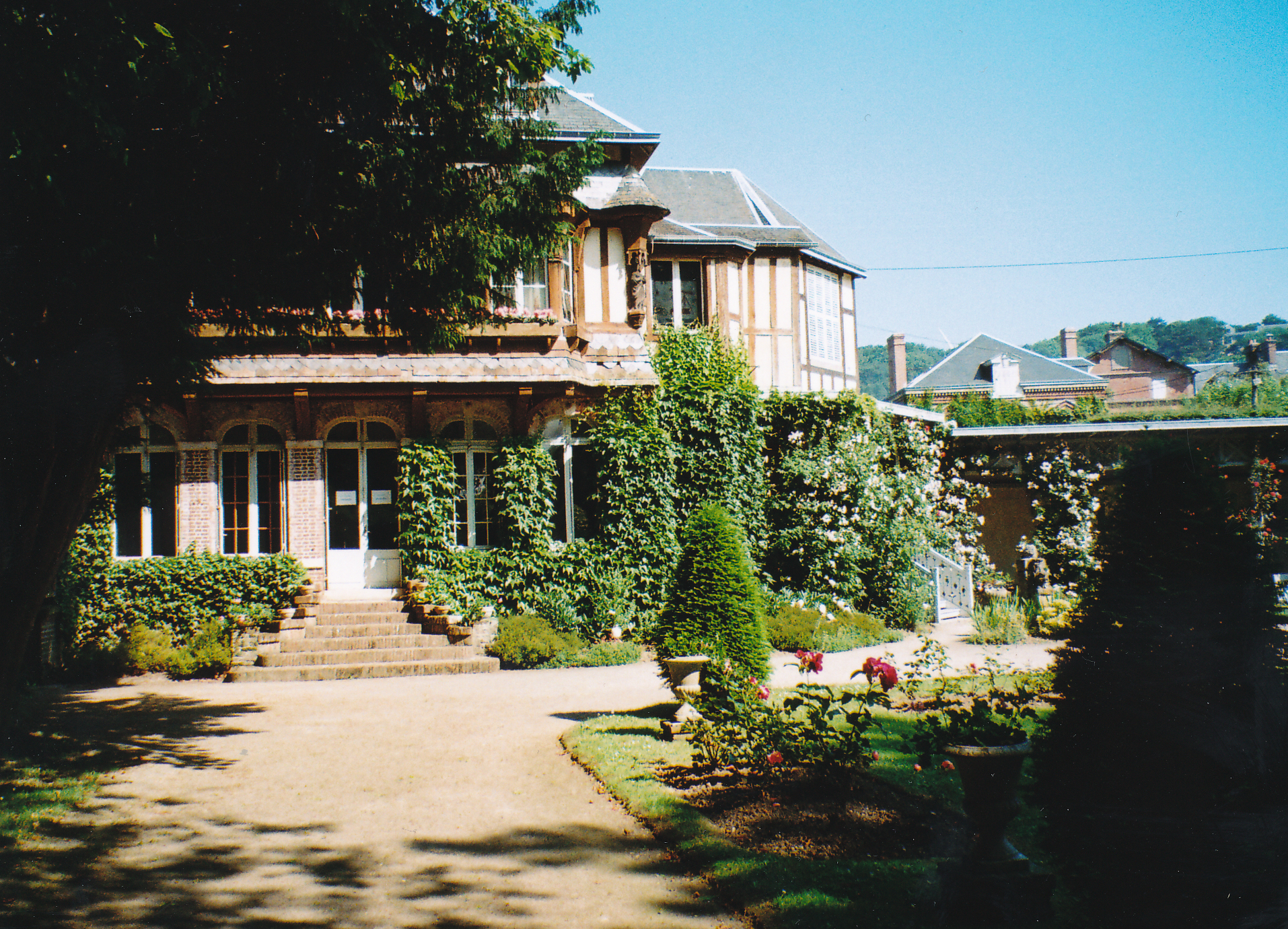
Leblanc's house in Étretat, today a museum named Le Clos Arsène Lupin

In 1918, Maurice Leblanc bought a half-timbered Anglo-Norman house in Étretat (which he would name Clos Lupin), where he wrote 19 novels and 39 short stories. Faced with the imminent war with Nazi Germany, (Note: France declared war on Nazi Germany on 3 September 1939, two days after the German invasion of Poland (see French declaration of war on Germany (1939)).) he left Clos Lupin in 1939 and took refuge in Perpignan, where he died of pneumonia in 1941. Disinterred from the Saint-Martin cemetery in Perpignan in 1947, he was reburied on 14 October of the same year at the Montparnasse cemetery in Paris, alongside his wife Marguerite and other members of his family (notably his step-brother René Renoult).

== Private life ==
At the end of 1888, Maurice Leblanc decided to leave Rouen for Paris where he married, on 10 January 1889, Marie-Ernestine Flannel (1865-1941). They divorced in 1895. By Marie-Ernestine Flannel he fathered Louise Amélie Marie Leblanc (1889-1974). Maurice later fell in love with Marguerite Wormser (1865-1950) who already had a son Claude Oulmann (1902-1994), who was subsequently authorized by decree to bear the name of Leblanc. Maurice had health problems and sank into a depression, which was compounded by Marguerite's divorce from her first husband taking time to go through the courts. Leblanc and Wormser did not marry until 31 January 1906.

== Legacy ==
The "Association des Amis d'Arsène Lupin" (Association of Friends of Arsène Lupin) was founded in 1985 by the philosopher François George. Its members are sometimes known as "lupinophiles".

Leblanc's work inspired Gaston Leroux (creator of Rouletabille), as well as Souvestre and Allain (creators of Fantômas).

Arsène Lupin's exploits took place in the capital and in Pays de Caux, which Maurice Leblanc knew well. Being a collector of postcards, he had listed no less than four hundred manors between Le Havre, Rouen and Dieppe. The "lupinophiles" roam the places mentioned in the intrigues of Leblanc in Normandy: Étretat and "the treasure of the kings of France", Tancarville, the underground passage of Jumièges leading to the medieval treasure of the abbeys, etc.

=== In popular culture ===
The Japanese character Lupin III, first appearing in manga series Lupin III in 1967, was written as the grandson of Arsène Lupin. As this was done without permission from Leblanc's estate, this was later the source of a lawsuit, though the copyright on Leblanc's work has since expired. When the anime version was broadcast in France, the character was renamed Edgar, le détective cambrioleur ("Edgar, the Burglar Detective"). The authors of various Lupin the Third properties sometimes draw on Leblanc's novels as inspiration; notably, the film The Castle of Cagliostro was loosely based on La Comtesse de Cagliostro (The Countess of Cagliostro).

Leblanc and his gentleman-thief character are also referenced in Persona 5, where the main character's persona is Arsène. During the game, the main character resides in the attic of Café Leblanc.

Most recently, the main character of the Netflix series Lupin, released in January 2021, used Lupin as an inspiration for his own grand theft. Inspired by one of the Lupin books, he tries to avenge his father's wrongful accusation of stealing a necklace years earlier. He decides to steal the same necklace from the Louvre by mimicking the style of Arsène Lupin. Parts of the final episode of Part One were filmed in the town of Étretat. This location is significant because Maurice Leblanc lived in the commune. Some of the works were written at his residence there. The building is now the Clos Lupin Museum.

== Selected bibliography ==
- Une femme (1893)
- Armelle et Claude (1897)
- Voici des ailes (1898)
- Les Lèvres jointes (1899)
- L'Enthousiasme (1901)
- Un vilain couple (1901)
- Gueule rouge (1904)
- 80 chevaux (1904)
- La Pitié, Play (1906)
- Arsène Lupin contre Herlock Sholmès (1908)
- L'Aiguille creuse ("The Hollow Needle") (1909)
- 813 (1910)
- La Frontière ("The Frontier") (1911)
- Les Trois Yeux ("The Three Eyes") (1919)
- La Robe d'écaille rose (1920)
- Le Formidable Événement ("The Tremendous Event") (1920)
- Le Cercle rouge (1922)
- Dorothée, danseuse de corde (US: "The Secret Tomb", UK: "Dorothy the Rope Dancer") (1922)
- La Comtesse de Cagliostro: Dans robore fortuna, Des rois de Bohême, Le trésor des rois de France, Le chandelier à sept bras (1924)
- La Vie extravagante de Balthazar (1925)
- Le Prince de Jéricho ("Man of Mystery") (1930)
- Les Clefs mystérieuses (1932)
- La Forêt des aventures (1933)
- Le Chapelet rouge (1934)
- L'Image de la femme nue ("Wanton Venus") (1934)
- Le Scandale du gazon bleu (1935)
- De minuit à sept heures ("From Midnight to Morning") (1937)
