= List of Ace Attorney episodes =

Ace Attorney is a 2016 anime television series based on Capcom's video game series of the same name. The series follows rookie defense attorney Phoenix Wright as he stands in court to defend clients accused of murder, aided by his spirit medium assistant, Maya Fey. The series is directed by Ayumu Watanabe at A-1 Pictures, with screenplay by Atsuhiro Tomioka and character design by Keiko Ōta and Koji Watanabe. The series aired on NNS across Japan between April 2, 2016, and September 24, 2016, replacing Kindaichi Case Files R in its initial timeslot. The series was simulcast by Crunchyroll, who offer multiple subtitle tracks featuring both the original Japanese names and localized English names, and is distributed on home video in North America by Funimation. For the first thirteen episodes, the opening theme is "Gyakuten Winner" (逆転Winner; "Turnabout Winner") by Johnny's West while the ending theme is "Message" by Rei Yasuda. From episode 14 to 24, the opening theme is "Jinsei wa Subarashii" (人生は素晴らしい; "Life is Wonderful") by Johnny's West while the ending theme is "Jun'ai Chaos" (純愛カオス, Jun'ai Kaosu; "Pure Love Chaos") by Tokyo Performance Doll. A second season by CloverWorks aired from October 6, 2018, to March 30, 2019, with a simulcast by Crunchyroll and a dubbed version streamed by Funimation. (Note: The second season was originally credited to A-1 Pictures. However, the credit was transferred to CloverWorks after their separation from the studio in October 2018.) For the first twelve episodes, the opening theme is "Never Lose" by Tomohisa Yamashita, while the ending theme is "Starting Blue" (スターティングブルー) by halca. From episode thirteen onwards, the opening theme is "Reason" by Yamashita while the ending theme is "Beautiful Days" (ビューティフルデイズ) by Coalamode.

== Series overview ==
Season	Episodes	Originally released	
Season	Episodes	First released	Last released
1	24	April 2, 2016	September 24, 2016
2	23	October 6, 2018	March 30, 2019

== Episode list ==
=== Season 1 (2016) ===
No. overall	No. in season	Title	Directed by	Original release date
1	1	"The First Turnabout"; Transliteration: "Hajimete no Gyakuten" (Japanese: はじめての逆転)	Yukiko Imai	April 2, 2016
Rookie defense attorney Phoenix Wright faces his first trial, where he must defend his childhood friend Larry Butz for the murder of his ex-girlfriend, Cindy Stone. Prosecutor Winston Payne brings out the key witness, Frank Sahwit, who claims to have seen Larry leave Cindy's apartment after the murder. With help from his mentor Mia Fey, Phoenix spots a contradiction between Sahwit's testimony and the time of Cindy's death, to which Sahwit responds that the time he heard came from the murder weapon: a handmade alarm clock modeled after The Thinker. This leads Phoenix to deduce that the only way Sahwit could have known The Thinker was a clock was to use it himself to kill Cindy. Receiving advice from Mia, Phoenix finds that the discrepancy between the time of death and the clock's time is due to Cindy having come home from an overseas trip in another time zone. Larry is acquitted and gives Mia another Thinker clock as thanks. Some time later, the clock becomes the center of another incident.
2	2	"Turnabout Sisters – 1st Trial"; Transliteration: "Gyakuten Shimai: 1st Trial" (Japanese: 逆転姉妹 1st Trial)	Shingo Uchida	April 9, 2016
Mia calls her younger sister, Maya, requesting her to hold onto some evidence she has hidden inside the Thinker clock. That night, Phoenix finds Mia killed in their office, with Maya nearby. Discovering a receipt inscribed with Maya's name in Mia's blood, police detective Dick Gumshoe arrests Maya under suspicion of murder. Phoenix speaks with Maya, who reveals herself to be a spirit medium in training. Doubtful of Phoenix despite his offer to defend her, Maya requests the service of Mia's mentor, Marvin Grossberg, who gladly accepts. The next day, after finding Maya's phone containing a recording of her conversation with Mia, Phoenix learns from Gumshoe that Maya's prosecution is being handled by Miles Edgeworth, an alleged genius who has never lost a case. While investigating the key witness, April May, Phoenix discovers a screwdriver, cuff link, and wiretap in her hotel room. Grossberg then suddenly informs Phoenix that he can no longer take Maya's case. Phoenix refuses to give up on Maya, who is moved by his dedication and agrees to let him defend her.
3	3	"Turnabout Sisters – 2nd Trial"; Transliteration: "Gyakuten Shimai: 2nd Trial" (Japanese: 逆転姉妹 2nd Trial)	Yoshiko Mikami	April 16, 2016
During the trial, Phoenix points out that Mia could not have written the bloody message as she died instantly, but Edgeworth presents an updated autopsy report that negates his theory. April is called to the stand, claiming to have seen the murder from her hotel room. Phoenix counters that she could not have heard the time from the clock as its clockwork had already been removed, proving its time of removal through Maya's phone recording. Phoenix then presents the wiretap found in April's hotel room, to which April angrily reveals she was ordered to place the wiretap in Mia's office. After the trial is extended due to the new facts presented, Grossberg explains his declination of the case to Phoenix, revealing that he is being blackmailed by company president Redd White, whom Mia had been investigating for corporate crime before her death. Matching White's cuff link with the one found with the wiretap, Phoenix accuses White of murdering Mia. In response, White implicates Phoenix for the crime and has him arrested instead.
4	4	"Turnabout Sisters – Last Trial"; Transliteration: "Gyakuten Shimai: Last Trial" (Japanese: 逆転姉妹 Last Trial)	Satoshi Saga	April 23, 2016
Phoenix stands to defend himself in court, with Maya acting as his assistant. Taking the witness stand, White claims to have heard a glass light stand shattering from his hotel room as the murder occurred, but Phoenix and Maya deduce that the only way White could have known about the stand is if he was in the office. Edgeworth posits that White saw the light stand while planting the wiretap months before the murder, which Phoenix cannot refute. Desperate, Maya awakens her power as a spirit medium, allowing her to channel Mia's spirit. Under Mia's guidance, Phoenix finds that the receipt with the bloody message dates the light stand's purchase as the day before the murder. Edgeworth attempts to extend the trial further, but Mia forces White to confess his guilt by threatening him with a list of White's blackmail victims. Following Phoenix and Maya's acquittal, Mia arranges for Maya to stay with Phoenix at the newly renamed Wright & Co. Law Offices.
5	5	"Turnabout Samurai – 1st Trial"; Transliteration: "Gyakuten no Tonosaman: 1st Trial" (Japanese: 逆転のトノサマン 1st Trial)	Unknown	April 30, 2016
Will Powers, the star of the television drama Steel Samurai, is arrested for the murder of his co-star Jack Hammer, who portrayed the show's villain. Deciding to defend Powers, Phoenix and Maya visit the show's studio to interview witnesses and search for evidence. During the trial the next day, a retired woman, Wendy Oldbag, presents a photo that allegedly shows a fully costumed Powers en route to the crime scene, identifying him via a sprained ankle he sustained during rehearsal. However, Phoenix points out that because the photo subject's identity is concealed, someone else could have worn the costume and imitated Powers' injury to frame him, implicating Oldbag as a suspect. Outraged by the accusation, Oldbag confirms that others were present at the studio during the crime.
6	6	"Turnabout Samurai – 2nd Trial"; Transliteration: "Gyakuten no Tonosaman: 2nd Trial" (Japanese: 逆転のトノサマン 2nd Trial)	Kiyomitsu Sato	May 7, 2016
Court is adjourned after Oldbag names studio director Sal Manella and producer Dee Vasquez as potential witnesses to the murder. Resuming their investigation, Phoenix and Maya go to Studio 2 to meet with Manella and Vasquez, who claim they could not have gone to Studio 1 where the body was found because the path was blocked by a broken mascot head. Later, after hearing Oldbag mention an accident that took place five years ago, Phoenix and Maya come across Cody Hackins, a boy who claims to have witnessed the incident. The next day, after Phoenix spends the entire night watching Steel Samurai DVDs for clues, he deduces from Cody's recollection of the day that the costumed figure is actually Jack Hammer. Cody then explains what he saw and shows Phoenix a photo of the incident, showing that Hammer had gone to Studio 2, leading Phoenix to suspect Vasquez as the murderer. Vasquez summons a group of mobsters to silence Phoenix and Maya, but when Gumshoe comes to their rescue, she agrees to testify in court.
7	7	"Turnabout Samurai – Last Trial"; Transliteration: "Gyakuten no Tonosaman: Last Trial" (Japanese: 逆転のトノサマン Last Trial)	Shingo Kaneko	May 14, 2016
The trial resumes with Vasquez taking the witness stand and Phoenix presenting the information he received from Cody. Vasquez claims that she could not have used the alleged murder weapon, the Samurai Spear, as it is too heavy. Phoenix deduces that the spear is not the murder weapon, but lacks the evidence to prove it. Upset by the proceeding, Cody stands up for his sense of justice, which inspires Oldbag to give Phoenix a photo of the earlier studio accident used by Vasquez to blackmail Hammer, revealing the actual weapon to be the spiked fence outside Studio 2's trailer. When challenged with finding Vasquez's motive, Phoenix posits that Hammer had attempted to murder Vasquez and was killed in self-defense, but is again without proof. Realizing Vasquez's guilt, Edgeworth forces her to testify about what happened after the body was found, providing Phoenix with the opening needed to expose her as the true culprit.
8	8	"Turnabout Goodbyes – 1st Trial"; Transliteration: "Gyakuten, Soshite Sayonara: 1st Trial" (Japanese: 逆転、そしてサヨナラ 1st Trial)	Takaharu Ozaki	May 21, 2016
On Christmas Day, Edgeworth is arrested under suspicion of shooting a man on Gourd Lake. Despite being warned by Edgeworth to stay away from the case, Phoenix and Maya investigate Gourd Lake, where Gumshoe begs Phoenix to defend Edgeworth; they also encounter Larry, now a vendor at the lake, who reveals Edgeworth to be his and Phoenix's childhood friend. They then meet photographer Lotta Hart, who has been taking pictures of the lake using a sound-activated camera in the hopes of finding the fabled monster Gourdy. Lotta discovers she has photos taken during the murder, and decides to bring them to the police. Grossberg identifies the victim as Robert Hammond, a former lawyer in his firm who served as defense attorney for the DL-6 Incident, a 15-year old case surrounding the death of Edgeworth's father, Gregory, that led to the disappearance of Maya's mother, Misty. Phoenix once again approaches Edgeworth, deciding to take his defense in order to both prove his innocence and solve the mystery surrounding the DL-6 Incident. Edgeworth accepts Phoenix's offer, revealing that the prosecutor will be his undefeated mentor, Manfred von Karma.
9	9	"Turnabout Goodbyes – 2nd Trial"; Transliteration: "Gyakuten, Soshite Sayonara: 2nd Trial" (Japanese: 逆転、そしてサヨナラ 2nd Trial)	Tomio Yamauchi	May 28, 2016
The trial opens with Gumshoe presenting the murder weapon: a pistol with fingerprints from Edgeworth's right hand. Lotta's testimony further implicates Edgeworth when she claims to have seen him and Hammond amidst two loud bangs after midnight, submitting a photo as evidence. Under threat of being held in contempt of court, Phoenix is unable to find any beneficial information in Lotta's testimony until Maya challenges its validity and is ejected in Phoenix's place. This allows Phoenix to determine that Lotta was too focused on finding Gourdy to pay any attention to the murder. Lotta then presents an enlarged version of the photo to show the pistol being fired from the attacker's left hand, contradicting Gumshoe's statement. After court adjourns for further investigation, Phoenix discovers "Gourdy" to be Larry's promotional Steel Samurai balloon that flew into the lake in an air tank accident. Grateful for learning the truth from Phoenix, Lotta gives him a second photo of the incident and directs him to another witness: the elderly caretaker of a boat rental shop.
10	10	"Turnabout Goodbyes – 3rd Trial"; Transliteration: "Gyakuten, Soshite Sayonara: 3rd Trial" (Japanese: 逆転、そしてサヨナラ 3rd Trial)	Ayako Kawano	June 4, 2016
As Phoenix and Maya try to interview the caretaker about the incident, they are surprised when his parrot, Polly, mentions the DL-6 Incident. Phoenix goes to the police station to research the case, only to discover that von Karma has taken all the files relating to it. On the second day of the trial, the caretaker implicates Edgeworth as the murderer he saw, and Edgeworth is declared guilty. However, Larry suddenly bursts onto the scene to give his own testimony, convincing the judge to overturn his decision. Larry states that he was out on a boat searching for his balloon, claiming he only heard one bang that night while listening to the radio. Using Larry's recollection of the radio show he heard, Phoenix realizes that the bang Larry heard actually took place before midnight, the same time Lotta's other photo was taken. From this, he deduces that the murderer killed Hammond elsewhere before pretending to be the victim to frame Edgeworth. Just as Phoenix suspects the true murderer to be the unnamed caretaker, the court discovers that he has fled the scene.
11	11	"Turnabout Goodbyes – 4th Trial"; Transliteration: "Gyakuten, Soshite Sayonara: 4th Trial" (Japanese: 逆転、そしてサヨナラ 4th Trial)	Yūsuke Maruyama	June 11, 2016
After Gumshoe manages to recapture the caretaker, he invites Phoenix and Maya to investigate his shack, where they find a safe containing a letter detailing how to frame Edgeworth. Court resumes, with Phoenix having Grossberg testify about the DL-6 Incident. Grossberg reveals that Yanni Yogi, the bailiff originally accused of Gregory's murder, had his life ruined by Hammond's defense, leading to his fiancée's suicide a year later. Tasked with proving the caretaker is Yogi himself, Phoenix brings in Polly as a witness. Despite discovering Polly has been retrained to stay quiet about the DL-6 Incident, Phoenix manages to deduce that Polly is named after Yogi's late fiancée, and that the safe combination code is the date the DL-6 Incident took place. Feeling his duty has been fulfilled, the caretaker confirms himself to be Yogi and confesses his crime. Just as Edgeworth is declared innocent of Hammond's murder, Edgeworth himself confesses that he is the true culprit of the DL-6 Incident.
12	12	"Turnabout Goodbyes – Last Trial"; Transliteration: "Gyakuten, Soshite Sayonara: Last Trial" (Japanese: 逆転、そしてサヨナラ Last Trial)	Yoshihide Ibata	June 18, 2016
Despite Edgeworth's confession of guilt, Phoenix continues to believe in his innocence. Edgeworth recalls that he threw a pistol to try and stop Yogi and Gregory from fighting in an elevator, hearing a gunshot and a loud scream before passing out. Examining photographic evidence, Phoenix notices a bullet hole in the elevator door, suggesting another bullet was fired, though von Karma points out that only one bullet was found at the crime scene. Phoenix theorizes that the second bullet hit the actual murderer, whom he suspects to be von Karma. Using a metal detector Maya brought with her, Phoenix detects that the bullet is still inside von Karma's shoulder, but is unable to compare the ballistics as the bullet from Yogi's case is missing. Faking an illness to buy some time, Edgeworth helps Maya sneak into von Karma's office and retrieve the bullet that killed Gregory which, along with von Karma's screams, proves his guilt. After the trial, Edgeworth gives his thanks to Phoenix while Maya decides to return to her home town to complete her spirit medium training.
13	13	"Turnabout Promise"; Transliteration: "Gyakuten no Yakusoku" (Japanese: 逆転の約束)	Kosaya	June 25, 2016
Phoenix recalls the incident that first brought him, Edgeworth, and Larry together in elementary school, beginning when Larry picks up lunch money unknowingly dropped by Edgeworth. Phoenix is believed to have stolen the money and put on a mock trial, where Edgeworth and Larry defend against the class's accusations. Later that day, Edgeworth helps Phoenix and Larry find the owner of an abandoned dog that Larry had come across. After the owner rejects the dog, Edgeworth decides to take it home with him; he also takes an interest in Phoenix and Larry's favorite television show, becoming friends with them. However, following the death of his father, Edgeworth is taken in by von Karma, leaving his new friends behind. Going back for a key chain that von Karma had thrown away, Edgeworth finds Phoenix and Larry waiting for him, and they assure him that they will always be friends. Back in the present, Edgeworth disembarks to places unknown, leaving behind a note that reads, "Prosecutor Edgeworth chooses death."
14	14	"Reunion and Turnabout – 1st Trial"; Transliteration: "Saikai, Soshite Gyakuten: 1st Trial" (Japanese: 再会、そして逆転 1st Trial)	Shige Fukase	July 9, 2016
Surgeon Turner Grey is rumored to be responsible for the death of a nurse, Mimi Miney, who died in a traffic accident. Grey brings Phoenix with him to Kurain Village to seek Maya's spirit channeling assistance in clearing his name. Upon arriving, Phoenix meets Maya's cousin, Pearl, and her aunt, Morgan; Lotta is also present, seeking another scoop. Maya and Grey are locked inside the channeling chamber for the ceremony while Phoenix and the others wait outside. Gunshots are suddenly heard from the chamber, and when Phoenix and Lotta break in, they discover Grey lying dead and what appears to be a possessed Maya holding Grey's gun. While Gumshoe interviews fellow guest and Mimi's sister Ini, Phoenix and Lotta investigate the crime scene, finding a peculiar hole in the wall. Afterwards, Pearl gives Phoenix a key she found in the incinerator. Maya is subsequently arrested under charges of Grey's murder, and Phoenix once again takes her defense to prove her innocence. On the day of the trial, Pearl comes to support Phoenix as discovers the prosecutor to be Manfred von Karma's daughter, Franziska.
15	15	"Reunion and Turnabout – 2nd Trial"; Transliteration: "Saikai, Soshite Gyakuten: 2nd Trial" (Japanese: 再会、そして逆転 2nd Trial)	Unknown	July 16, 2016
Gumshoe gives his testimony, explaining that Grey was first stabbed before being shot by his own pistol. He presents Maya's ceremonial robes, which are covered in blood and have a hole in the sleeve. While Franziska claims that bullet hole is irrelevant, Phoenix notices the hole is missing a gunpowder burn that would appear if it was shot at close range. Lotta is then brought to the stand, presenting the photo she had taken of "Maya" when entering the crime scene. Phoenix notices that the person in the photo is missing the head ornament Maya was wearing, believing that another person was impersonating Maya. As Phoenix struggles to prove how this additional person entered the locked room, Pearl manages to channel Mia, who reminds Phoenix of the room key Pearl gave him, which proves the possibility of another person.
16	16	"Reunion and Turnabout – 3rd Trial"; Transliteration: "Saikai, Soshite Gyakuten: 3rd Trial" (Japanese: 再会、そして逆転 3rd Trial)	Nanako Shimazaki	July 23, 2016
While returning to Kurain, Pearl explains to Phoenix how, when the murder took place, she was in an outdoor walkway trying to repair a sacred urn that she had accidentally broken. After speaking with Morgan, who explains how Maya was supposed to be next in line to inherit the channeling school following Misty's disappearance, Phoenix finds a piece of Maya's outfit in the incinerator where Pearl found the key. Coming across Lotta again, Phoenix finds a clothes basket with a hole in it, while Lotta gives him information on Ini, revealing she was in the same car accident as Mimi and had to undergo reconstruction surgery. As Phoenix questions Ini about the incident, Morgan goes with the police to join the investigation. On the second day of the trial, Phoenix asks Pearl to channel Mia again so that she doesn't hear what happens during the trial. The trial begins with Morgan testifying against Maya, claiming she fled from the channeling room after committing the murder, before Ini is brought to the stand.
17	17	"Reunion and Turnabout – Last Trial"; Transliteration: "Saikai, Soshite Gyakuten: Last Trial" (Japanese: 再会、そして逆転 Last Trial)	Shingo Kaneko	July 30, 2016
Ini claims that Maya, possessed by Mimi, came to see her in the side room following the murder. However, Phoenix finds this claim to be false, as she would have encountered Pearl trying to fix the urn in the walkway. Putting together the evidence, Phoenix deduces that Ini was hiding in the clothes basket in the channeling chamber, where she knocked out Maya and stabbed Grey, who used the last of his strength to try and shoot her. He further deduces that Morgan was her accomplice, helping her to frame Maya and dispose of evidence. Tasked with finding a motive for committing such a complicated murder, Phoenix questions Ini about the car accident, deducing from her statement that she is actually Mimi, who had been reconstructed with Ini's face following the accident that took the real Ini's life. Mimi reveals that she had hoped to escape her history of medical negligence following the accident, but when Grey's decision to hold a channeling ritual threatened to expose her, Morgan came up with the murder plan in order to frame Maya and have Pearl become the head of the Kurain school. Following the trial, as Morgan is arrested and the channeling school is temporarily closed, Pearl encourages Maya to return to Phoenix's side.
18	18	"Turnabout Big Top – 1st Trial"; Transliteration: "Gyakuten Sākasu: 1st Trial" (Japanese: 逆転サーカス 1st Trial)	Yūsuke Maruyama	August 6, 2016
Phoenix and Maya go to see the Berry Big Circus show headlined by magician Max Galactica. The next day, they discover that Max has been accused of murdering the circus' ringmaster, Russell Berry, though Max states he is innocent, as he was discussing his salary with him. After meeting Berry's daughter, Regina, Phoenix and Maya hear about the crime from Gumshoe, who claims that Max's ability to fly places him as the prime suspect as only the victim's footprints were found. Finding that most of the staff seem to also suspect Max because of his cocky attitude, they hear from Moe the Clown that Max allegedly hit Ben the ventriloquist with a bottle the other day. While looking through Berry's office, they find the contract that Max had mentioned to be dated a week prior to the meeting. Phoenix threatens to drop Max's defense, prompting Max to confess his strained relationship with the other performers, convincing Phoenix to change his mind. Phoenix ends up chasing a monkey to one of the performer's rooms, where they find a bust of Max and a diamond ring, which allegedly belongs to Ben's puppet, Trilo. Speaking through Trilo, Ben claims that he saw Max heading to the crime scene on the night of the murder, but Phoenix points out that he would've had to see the ringmaster too. Trilo rebukes Phoenix, saying he wasn't the only witness to the incident.
19	19	"Turnabout Big Top – 2nd Trial"; Transliteration: "Gyakuten Sākasu: 2nd Trial" (Japanese: 逆転サーカス 2nd Trial)	Naoki Hishikawa	August 13, 2016
As the trial begins, Gumshoe explains the strange circumstances of the case before Moe is brought to the stand as a witness, claiming that he saw Max flying off outside his window moments after Berry's murder. After the trial is postponed so that the prosecution can investigate how the murder occurred, Max reveals that he lent Berry his costume on the night of the murder. Revisiting the room they came across the previous day, Phoenix and Maya meet Ken "Acro" Dingling, an acrobat who lost the use of his legs six months ago, but he is dragged away by Franziska, who reveals she wants revenge against Phoenix for defeating Edgeworth. After hearing from Moe that Berry was angry about something on the morning of the murder, Phoenix checks his office and finds a threatening letter pertaining to an incident six months ago, calling Berry to the place where he was murdered. Asked about the incident, Moe explains how Acro's brother, Bat, was put into a coma by Regina's pet lion, Leon, who was then shot by Berry. Regina then reveals that she found the note while returning from Acro's room, leading Phoenix to suspect the note may be from Acro. As the trial resumes, Phoenix accuses Acro of being the one who plotted Berry's murder.
20	20	"Turnabout Big Top – Last Trial"; Transliteration: "Gyakuten Sākasu: Last Trial" (Japanese: 逆転サーカス Last Trial)	Yoshihide Ibata	August 20, 2016
Phoenix deduces the mystery behind the crime scene, explaining that a bust of Max was dropped on Berry's head when he attempted to open a heavy box. When the bust was pulled back up, it latched onto Max's costume, leading Moe to mistake it for Max himself. Believing Acro, who lives directly above the scene, is the only one who could have committed the crime, Phoenix brings out the threatening note, explaining how it relates to the incident six months ago. He reveals that the reason Bat was attacked was because the scarf Regina gave him was covered in pepper, which caused Leon to sneeze and bite down on him, meaning that Acro's intended target was Regina. As the decisive evidence, the bust, appears to be nowhere to be found, Phoenix deduces that Acro has been hiding it inside his wheelchair, leading Acro to admit his guilt. Afterwards, as Moe takes over as the Big Berry Circus' ringmaster, Gumshoe gets in contact with Edgeworth.
21	21	"Farewell, My Turnabout – 1st Trial"; Transliteration: "Saraba, Gyakuten: 1st Trial" (Japanese: さらば、逆転 1st Trial)	Nanako Shimazaki	September 3, 2016
During a Hero of Heroes Grand Prix event held at a hotel, one of the actors, Juan Corrida, is murdered, with the current Nickel Samurai actor, Matt Engarde, accused of the crime. Just after learning about the murder, Phoenix is contacted by someone known as Shelly de Killer, who reveals he has kidnapped Maya and will only release her if Phoenix can get Engarde acquitted within the trial's first day. The next day, Phoenix interviews Engarde's manager, Adrian Andrews, and investigates Corrida's dressing room. Just before the trial the following day, Franziska is suddenly shot by a sniper hired by de Killer, prompting Edgeworth, who has returned from his long absence, to take her place on the prosecutor's bench.
22	22	"Farewell, My Turnabout – 2nd Trial"; Transliteration: "Saraba, Gyakuten: 2nd Trial" (Japanese: さらば、逆転 2nd Trial)	Takaharu Ozaki	September 10, 2016
At the start of the trial, Gumshoe explains that, despite the obvious knife wound on the body, Corrida was actually killed by strangulation. Oldbag, who had been working security at the hotel, then testifies that she saw Engarde leave Corrida's room, presenting a photo of the Nickel Samurai costume. Noticing that the person in the costume is shorter than Engarde, Phoenix accuses Adrian and calls her to the stand. She reveals that she had planned to hold a conference with Corrida in the Nickel Samurai costume, as he knew a secret about Engarde's career. With Adrian refusing to testify and a lack of evidence to convict her, Phoenix is unable to stop the trial from becoming extended. After Phoenix manages to convince de Killer to give him more time, Edgeworth, learning about Maya's kidnapping from Phoenix, deduces from a calling card Adrian had picked up from the scene that Corrida was killed by de Killer, suspecting Engarde was the one who contracted him. Meanwhile, Maya manages to briefly break out of the basement and find a framed photo of someone before de Killer catches her again. Inspecting the crime scene again, Phoenix and Edgeworth discover a hidden camera hidden in one of the teddy bears, discovering Engarde was the one sent it. When confronted about it, Engarde reveals to Phoenix that he is indeed the one who contracted de Killer to kill Corrida.
23	23	"Farewell, My Turnabout – 3rd Trial"; Transliteration: "Saraba, Gyakuten: 3rd Trial" (Japanese: さらば、逆転 3rd Trial)	Unknown	September 17, 2016
Revealing that he hid the camera as insurance against de Killer, Engarde reminds Phoenix about what will happen to Maya if he fails to secure a "not guilty" verdict. As Edgeworth asks Phoenix to think about what the right thing to do is, they hear the sound of Engarde's pet cat over de Killer's radio, leading them to Engarde's mansion. Although Maya is nowhere to be found by the time they get there, they discover a photo of Adrian's sister, Celeste, and a message from Maya telling Phoenix to find Engarde guilty no matter the cost. The next day, as Edgeworth brings in Adrian to testify about a teddy bear that was removed from the crime scene, Pearl manages to use Mia to inform Gumshoe about Maya's current whereabouts. Adrian explains that the bear was a gift to Corrida from Celeste, who hung herself after being dumped by Corrida after he learned about her relationship with Engarde. She further reveals that Corrida was planning to reveal Celeste's suicide note to the public during the conference, leading Adrian to tamper with the crime scene in order to implicate Engarde. As the note is revealed to be inside the bear that was taken from the scene, Phoenix calls for the note to be analyzed to buy some time. Gumshoe manages to find some evidence left behind by Maya, but ends up getting into a traffic accident en route to the courtroom, where de Killer decides to testify over a transceiver.
24	24	"Farewell, My Turnabout – Last Trial"; Transliteration: "Saraba, Gyakuten: Last Trial" (Japanese: さらば、逆転 Last Trial)	Shige Fukase	September 24, 2016
De Killer claims that Adrian is his client, but exposes his lie when he wrongly assumes her to be a man. Just as de Killer adjusts his testimony and Engarde is about to be declared innocent, Franziska arrives with the video disk Gumshoe had picked up, containing footage of de Killer killing Corrida. Turning his thinking around, Phoenix shows the video to de Killer, revealing that Engarde had been planning to use it to blackmail him. Realizing he has been betrayed, de Killer cancels his contract with Engarde, choosing him as his next target, and releases Maya. Terrified for his own safety, Engarde is forced to confess his guilt. After the trial, as Franziska is baffled over Phoenix being happy with a guilty verdict, Edgeworth states that his battles with Phoenix have taught him that trust between attorneys and prosecutors is necessary in order to find the truth. As Maya is reunited with Phoenix, Edgeworth sees Franziska off at the airport.

=== Season 2 (2018–19) ===
No. overall	No. in season	Title	Directed by	Original release date
25	1	"The Lost Turnabout"; Transliteration: "Ushinawareta Gyakuten" (Japanese: 失われた逆転)	Yukiko Imai	October 6, 2018
Phoenix suffers a blow to the head from behind and loses his memory right before a trial, in which he is defending police officer Maggey Byrde for the murder of her boyfriend and fellow officer Dustin Prince. Despite his amnesia, Phoenix finds several contradictions in the evidence presented that implicate the key witness, Richard Wellington, as the true murderer. When Wellington's motive is brought into question, Maya arrives with evidence that Wellington is part of a con artist group, killing Prince out of fear that he would find the group's contacts on his missing phone, which Maggey found on a date with the in-uniform Prince. As Wellington states he has already recovered his phone, having attacked Phoenix in order to do so, Phoenix regains his memories and reveals that the phone Wellington took is actually his own, leaving Phoenix with Wellington's phone and proving Maggey's innocence.
26	2	"The Stolen Turnabout – 1st Trial"; Transliteration: "Nusumareta Gyakuten: 1st Trial" (Japanese: 盗まれた逆転 1st Trial)	Yukiko Imai; Masatoyo Takada	October 13, 2018
When the Kurain Village's sacred urn is stolen from an exhibit at the Lordly Tailor by the mysterious thief Mask DeMasque, Phoenix, Maya, and Pearl investigate the scene and meet self-proclaimed ace detective Luke Atmey. It is then that Ron DeLite turns himself in, claiming to be DeMasque, while his wife Desirée claims that Ron is simply a DeMasque fanatic and asks Phoenix to defend him. As Phoenix visits Atmey at his agency, where he feels something inside a bag, Maya and Pearl, upset with Phoenix for taking Ron's defense, go to Ron and Desirée's apartment, where they find a green envelope. The trial soon begins, with Phoenix facing off against a legendary prosecutor named Godot.
27	3	"The Stolen Turnabout – 2nd Trial"; Transliteration: "Nusumareta Gyakuten: 2nd Trial" (Japanese: 盗まれた逆転 2nd Trial)	Shige Fukase	October 20, 2018
As Phoenix struggles to make a case that Ron wasn't the one who stole the urn, Maya brings in Larry, who was working as a security guard for the exhibition. Larry presents Ron's ID card for KB Security while Maya presents blackmail letter, both of which place Ron at KB Security at the time of the theft at Lordly Tailor. This leads Phoenix to suspect Atmey of being Mask DeMasque, at which point Desirée brings in the stolen urn with Phoenix's fingerprints on it, proving that it was in Atmey's agency. Atmey admits that he is Mask DeMasque and Ron is cleared of the theft charges, but it is then that Godot reveals that the CEO of KB Security, Kane Bullard, has been murdered, with the evidence Phoenix had brought up in trial directly placing Ron as the prime suspect.
28	4	"The Stolen Turnabout – 3rd Trial"; Transliteration: "Nusumareta Gyakuten: 3rd Trial" (Japanese: 盗まれた逆転 3rd Trial)	Takaaki Wada	October 27, 2018
After Phoenix and Maya notice that her urn has been covered in splotches and returned to its original shape, Adrian reveals she accidentally broke and tried to cover it up by moving a statue, which was in different position to when Phoenix first found it. After learning the details about Bullard's death from Gumshoe, the pair learn from Larry that an emergency buzzer in Bullard's office went off at the time of murder. Phoenix then questions Ron, who explains that he was knocked out when he went to KB Security, waking up to find Bullard already dead. Suspecting that all these pieces lead back to Atmey, whose trial for the urn theft is taking place at the same time as Ron's murder trial, Phoenix is faced with a race against time to bring Atmey to the stand before his trial is concluded.
29	5	"The Stolen Turnabout – Last Trial"; Transliteration: "Nusumareta Gyakuten: Last Trial" (Japanese: 盗まれた逆転 Last Trial)	Shige Fukase	November 3, 2018
Godot begins the trial by stating that the CEO fired Ron for stealing confidential data and was blackmailing him in exchange for not telling Desirée. Deducing that the security buzzer went off while Ron was unconscious, Phoenix succeeds in bringing Atmey to the stand before he is convicted of the theft. Using Adrian's testimony regarding the statue, Phoenix deduces that Atmey moved it himself to use a security photo taken days ago as an alabi, but is unable to prove Atmey was at KB Security on the night of the murder. However, Atmey inadvertently reveals he knew Ron was wearing Mask DeMasque's costume, placing him at the scene of the murder. Atmey reveals that he had manipulated Ron into following his plans up until Bullard blackmailed Atmey for stealing a diamond, prompting Atmey to kill him and frame Ron.
30	6	"Sound the Turnabout Melody"; Transliteration: "Todoke Gyakuten no Merodi" (Japanese: 届け逆転のメロディ)	Unknown	November 10, 2018
Phoenix thinks back to his middle school days, three years after Edgeworth lost his father and began living with von Karma and Franziska. One day, while searching for his lost dog in the mall, Edgeworth gets a message from Phoenix via a radio show cheering him on. As Edgeworth finds his dog alongside another lost dog named Napalm, a woman named Goldy Gerwitz appears claiming to be Napalm's owner, but Edgeworth soon deduces that she just wanted Napalm to claim a reward, which he donates to a charity.
31	7	"Recipe for Turnabout – 1st Trial"; Transliteration: "Gyakuten no Reshipi: 1st Trial" (Japanese: 逆転のレシピ 1st Trial)	Erika Okamoto	November 17, 2018
Phoenix is surprised to hear that Maggey was found guilty in a murder trial that he himself was reportedly the defense attorney for. Realising that someone must have impersonated him, Phoenix looks into Maggey's case for a retrial, learning that she witnessed a man killing programmer Glen Elg with poison while working at the Trés Bien restaurant, becoming accused of the murder as no one else reported seeing the man in question. Interviewing the restaurant's chef, Jean Armstrong, Phoenix further learns that Elg had won the lottery, providing a motive for his murder. As the retrial gets off to a rocky start, Gumshoe brings in witness Victor Kido, whose testimony about what he witnessed contains enough contradictions to warrant extra time for investigation. After the trial is suspended, Phoenix and Maya have a run-in with Phoenix's imposter.
32	8	"Recipe for Turnabout – 2nd Trial"; Transliteration: "Gyakuten no Reshipi: 2nd Trial" (Japanese: 逆転のレシピ 2nd Trial)	Shige Fukase; Shinichiro Ueda	November 24, 2018
Resuming their investigation at Trés Bien, Phoenix and Maya learn that Armstrong owes money to a loan shark. After getting more details from Kido, Phoenix and Maya visit the office of the loan shark in question and the one who impersonated Phoenix, Furio Tigre. Afterwards, the pair hear from Gumshoe about Tigre's relationship with Viola Cadaverini, the granddaughter of a mob boss, as well how Elg had planned to pay off a debt he owed to Tigre with a computer virus had he not won the lottery. After Maggey reveals that Viola was at the restaurant on the day of the murder, Phoenix clarifies with Viola, who had presumed that Tigre had saved her life out of love, that he was the one responsible for her accident and had to pay compensation to her family. Realizing the truth, Viola gives Phoenix her medical papers with a hidden message on the back.
33	9	"Recipe for Turnabout – Last Trial"; Transliteration: "Gyakuten no Reshipi: Last Trial" (Japanese: 逆転のレシピ Last Trial)	Yorifusa Yamaguchi	December 1, 2018
Following a hole-filled testimony by Armstrong, Phoenix suspects that the murder Kido witnessed was actually a reenactment which took place after the actual murder. After Armstrong explains he was forced to hide Elg's body and participate in the reenactment, Tigre is brought in to testify, with the papers given to Phoenix by Viola placing him at the scene. Phoenix deduces that Tigre wanted Elg's virus to pay off Viola's medical bills, but when Elg won the lottery, eliminating the need to sell it to him, Tigre killed him and stole the virus before having Viola help him reenact the scene to frame Maggey. Lacking the evidence needed to seal a victory, Phoenix bluffs about some evidence brought in by Gumshoe to trick Tigre into correcting him and revealing his own guilt, resulting in Maggey being declared innocent.
34	10	"Northward, Turnabout Express – 1st Trial"; Transliteration: "Gyakuten Tokkyū, Kita e: 1st Trial" (Japanese: 逆転特急,北へ 1st Trial)	Takaaki Wada	December 8, 2018
On New Year's Eve, Phoenix and Maya, along with Gumshoe and the judge, are invited by Avery Richman to ride the maiden voyage of the Silver Star express train. During the voyage, Gumshoe spots a strange soul outside before Richman, a fugitive who was sentenced to death, takes over the train with his staff. Believing that he was wrongly declared guilty in an American court, Richman reveals he had invited all the witnesses to that case in order to hold a fair retrial, with Phoenix as his defense and Tristan Turnbull as the prosecutor. Gumshoe attempts to rescue them, only to discover the dining car that everyone is in has seemingly vanished from the train.
35	11	"Northward, Turnabout Express – 2nd Trial"; Transliteration: "Gyakuten Tokkyū, Kita e: 2nd Trial" (Japanese: 逆転特急,北へ 2nd Trial)	Ayako Kawano	December 15, 2018
The details of Richman's original trial state that a secretary-general named Benjamin Cashanova was shot during a year-end ceremony, with Richman found with a pistol in the direction the gunshot came from. Learning from witnesses that a tray was dropped by an injured waiter just before the gunshot, Phoenix suspects that the waiter, Gale Gaelic, had intentionally followed Richman to his position in the hall and dropped the tray to draw attention towards him. Just then, the group discover one of the rooms in Car 1 set on fire with Gale allegedly found stabbed to death inside, only for the corpse to mysteriously disappear shortly afterwards. Meanwhile, Gumshoe manages to get in touch with Edgeworth, who looks into strange circumstances surrounding Richman's case, only to be brought before the US prosecutor committee. While they watch the broadcast of Richman's retrial, Gale's corpse suddenly appears in Car 3 where Gumshoe is.
36	12	"Northward, Turnabout Express – Last Trial"; Transliteration: "Gyakuten Tokkyū, Kita e: Last Trial" (Japanese: 逆転特急,北へ Last Trial)	Norihito Takahashi; Yorifusa Yamaguchi	December 22, 2018
Gumshoe reports about Gale's corpse and the "soul" he saw, which Phoenix reveals was a brief fire that he saw, as the train's cars were actually rearranged just before the takeover. This leads Phoenix to deduce that the corpse from Car 1 was a fake and the real Gale was killed in Car 3 during dinnertime, suspecting Turnbull of the crime with Rick serving as his accomplice. Rick reveals he was forced by the US prosecutor committee to steal a gun with Richman's fingerprints on it which was used to frame him for the murder of Cashanova, who was actually killed by Gale. Turnbull claims he wasn't involved, but Edgeworth reports in and verifies Turnbull's involvement in the trial, having obtained the truth from the committee. Turnbull reveals that he killed Gale when he attempted to blackmail him and was forced to create the fake scenario when the takeover occurred. After Richman is declared not guilty, he intends to die alone by setting off a time bomb in the dining car, but the committee offers him a fair retrial, convincing him to safely join the others before the bomb goes off.
37	13	"Turnabout Memories"; Transliteration: "Omoide no Gyakuten" (Japanese: 思い出の逆転)	Shige Fukuse; Shinichiro Ueda	January 19, 2019
Five years ago, Phoenix is accused for the murder of Doug Swallow, who was electrocuted to death. Mia, who had previously been traumatized by her first trial a year ago, defends Phoenix in court, where Payne suggests Phoenix had bad blood with Swallow over his then girlfriend Dahlia Hawthorne and pushed him into a severed electrical cable. Payne then brings in Dahlia to testify about the murder, but Mia discovers a ten-minute gap between when the cable snapped and when Swallow actually died. Mia deduces that this case is linked to an incident eight months ago, in which a lawyer was poisoned and Dahlia was the prime suspect. Upon learning that this was also the day Phoenix and Dahlia met, Mia suspects that the container used for the poison was a pendant Phoenix received from Dahlia that day. Refusing to accept that Dahlia could do such a thing, Phoenix eats the pendant, leaving Mia without any decisive evidence. Urged by Mia to give the proper truth, Phoenix reveals that on the day of the murder, Swallow told him that Dahlia had stolen poison both eight months ago and the night before. From this, Mia deduces that Dahlia had originally intended to kill Phoenix to retrieve her pendant by poisoning his cold medicine, finally proving Dahlia's guilt and Phoenix's innocence.
38	14	"Hear the Waves of Turnabout"; Transliteration: "Gyakuten no Shiosai ga Kikoeru" (Japanese: 逆転の潮騒が聞こえる)	Ayako Kawano	January 26, 2019
After accidentally breaking a precious seashell that she received from Maya, Pearl asks Phoenix to help her search for an identical looking shell without Maya knowing. As Phoenix helps her find the beach where it originally came from, Pearl recalls how Maya went against Morgan's authority to bring her to see the beach, giving her the shell as a reminder. While visiting the beach's shrine, Phoenix and Pearl run into Maya and learn that the shell she gave Pearl was something she received from Mia when she first took her to the beach, leading Pearl to feel even more guilty. Upon discovering that the shell was actually a bowl from a ramen shop, Phoenix offers Pearl one as a replacement, but Pearl decides to stick with the one she has due to the memories it contains.
39	15	"Turnabout Beginnings – 1st Trial"; Transliteration: "Hajimari no Gyakuten: 1st Trial" (Japanese: 始まりの逆転 1st Trial)	Takuhiro Kadochi	February 2, 2019
One year prior to her first meeting with Phoenix, Mia takes on her first client; a death row convict named Terry Fawles who is accused of murdering policewoman Valerie Hawthorne, with the assistance of her senior, Diego Armando. Taking the prosecution, a young Edgeworth explains how Fawles escaped from prison to meet up with Valerie, whose testimony accusing him of killing a hostage put him on death row five years ago. After Gumshoe details how Valerie was found stabbed in the trunk of a stolen car after meeting with Fawles on a bridge, presenting a photograph of the two meeting, Mia asks to cross-examine the one who took the picture, Melissa Foster. Noticing the inconsistencies in Foster's testimony, Mia suspects that Foster murdered Valerie and hid her in the trunk before imitating her and meeting with Fawles in order to frame him. It is then that Diego identifies Foster as the hostage who allegedly died five years ago, Valerie's sister Dahlia.
40	16	"Turnabout Beginnings – Last Trial"; Transliteration: "Hajimari no Gyakuten: Last Trial" (Japanese: 始まりの逆転 Last Trial)	Kakushi Ifuku	February 9, 2019
After Dahlia's attempt to feign ignorance only incriminates her further, Mia has Fawles testify about the incident from five years ago. Fawles reveals that the kidnapping was instigated by both Dahlia and Valerie themselves as a cover to transfer a valuable diamond worth $2 million, only for Valerie to shoot him and Dahlia to dive into the river on purpose, after which he was declared guilty due to Valerie's false testimony. Mia asserts that Dahlia sought to keep the diamond for herself and killed Valerie to prevent her from exposing her to the public. Lacking the evidence to back up her claim, Mia asks Fawles to testify about the moments before his arrest. However, before Fawles can give a full testimony, he drinks a poison that Dahlia told him to drink should they ever distrust each other, dying as a result and leaving Mia, Armando and Edgeworth devastated.
41	17	"Bridge to the Turnabout – 1st Trial"; Transliteration: "Kareinaru Gyakuten: 1st Trial" (Japanese: 華麗なる逆転 1st Trial)	Naoki Murata; Norihito Takahashi	February 16, 2019
Phoenix, Maya, and Pearl go to Hazakura Temple for Maya's training, where they meet children's book author Elise Deauxnim and nuns Bikini and Iris, along with Larry, who is studying as Elise's apprentice. As Maya goes to do her training, Phoenix notices Iris' strong resemblance to Dahlia. That night, Phoenix hears a scream and finds Elise impaled under the Shichishito sword of a statue. As Phoenix tries to cross the flaming Dusky Bridge to help Maya, it collapses underneath him, leading him to fall into the river. After Iris is arrested upon suspicion of murder Phoenix, who is hospitalized with a cold as a result of his fall, asks Edgeworth to defend Iris in his place.
42	18	"Bridge to the Turnabout – 2nd Trial"; Transliteration: "Kareinaru Gyakuten: 2nd Trial" (Japanese: 華麗なる逆転 2nd Trial)	Kazuki Ohashi	February 23, 2019
While investigating the shrine, Edgeworth listens to Bikini's account of Elise's murder, learning that Pearl has gone missing, before meeting up with Larry, who appears to be hiding something he saw on the night. On the day of the trial, Edgeworth arranges for a different judge to keep his identity as a prosecutor a secret, while Franziska serves as the prosecution in place of Godot. When Bikini testifies about the murder, Edgeworth deduces that the Shichishito Elise was found under wasn't the actual murder weapon. Franziska then suggests that Iris could've used a snowmobile to throw the real murder weapon into the river. With Iris refusing to say anything to defend herself, Larry steps in to testify.
43	19	"Bridge to the Turnabout – 3rd Trial"; Transliteration: "Kareinaru Gyakuten: 3rd Trial" (Japanese: 華麗なる逆転 3rd Trial)	Shinichiro Ueda	March 2, 2019
During his testimony, Larry presents a sketch he drew of what he saw on the night of the murder, allegedly depicting Iris flying over the flaming bridge. Upon being presented with a bloodied crystal sphere from Elise's staff, Edgeworth deduces that Elise was may have been killed somewhere else and brought to the temple where she was found via snowmobile. With enough evidence to require court to be adjourned for further investigation, Phoenix picks up the investigation and regains access across the Dusky Bridge, where he reunites with Pearl and discovers the cave Maya went into has been locked by a trick lock that Godot claims was locked by Iris. As Phoenix notices more oddities including shoveled snow and a message in blood implicating Maya, Godot expresses his hatred from him, blaming him for Mia's death.
44	20	"Bridge to the Turnabout – 4th Trial"; Transliteration: "Kareinaru Gyakuten: 4th Trial" (Japanese: 華麗なる逆転 4th Trial)	Ayako Kawano; Hiroyuki Kitakubo	March 9, 2019
While Iris is brought in to work on the trick lock, Phoenix finds a charred letter instructing someone to channel someone, along with a talisman Elise was carrying. Speaking with Bikini about the mark on the talisman, Phoenix learns that Elise's true identity is Maya's mother, Misty Fey, while also learning Iris is Morgan's daughter and the twin sister of Dahlia. Following a brief earthquake, Phoenix checks on the Inner Temple, only to discover more trick locks have been added. Later that night, Edgeworth discovers that Elise's staff contains the true murder weapon while also informing Phoenix that Dahlia was executed a month ago, leading Phoenix deduce that Dahlia's spirit was channeled by someone. After questioning Iris about her involvement with Dahlia's original kidnapping plan, Phoenix speaks with Pearl about the letter found, learning that she had tried to follow Morgan's instructions but was unable to channel Dahlia's spirit, believing someone else may have channeled her first.
45	21	"Bridge to the Turnabout – 5th Trial"; Transliteration: "Kareinaru Gyakuten: 5th Trial" (Japanese: 華麗なる逆転 5th Trial)	Takuhiro Kadochi; Kazuki Ohashi	March 16, 2019
As court resumes with Phoenix once again against Godot, Iris suddenly claims that she helped cover up Elise's murder after she was allegedly killed by Maya in self-defense. However, her testimony proves false with the reveal of real murder weapon and Elise's identity as Misty. When Iris' attempts to correct her testimony leads to the matter of how Elise's body was brought across the flaming bridge, Phoenix reveals the true meaning of Larry's sketch, which is actually an upside-down view of Elise being swung below the bridge. With this, Phoenix deduces that the Iris standing before him is actually the channelled spirit of Dahlia, who had switched herself with the real Iris during the earthquake the previous day.
46	22	"Bridge to the Turnabout – 6th Trial"; Transliteration: "Kareinaru Gyakuten: 6th Trial" (Japanese: 華麗なる逆転 6th Trial)	Kakushi Ifuku	March 23, 2019
Dahlia reveals she had plotted with Morgan to murder Maya and make Pearl head of the Kurain family so she could get revenge against Mia. She states that she was channelled inside of Misty before being stabbed by Maya, who allegedly committed suicide afterwards, after which she woke up inside the Sacred Cavern and locked Iris inside when she came to check up on it. However, thanks to some words by Godot, Phoenix manages to deduce that Maya is actually the one currently channelling Dahlia. Mia, who comes in possessing Pearl, reveals that she had instructed Maya to channel Dahlia and lock herself in the Sacred Cavern to keep herself safe. Faced with the humiliation of her constant failures against Mia, Dahlia's spirit is forever forced out of Maya's body, returning her to normal. Despite the emotional ordeal, however, Godot states that Maya must be questioned in order to determine who really killed Misty. Unable to get the identity of the true killer from Iris, Phoenix prepares to face the final battle alone without Mia's help.
47	23	"Bridge to the Turnabout – Last Trial"; Transliteration: "Kareinaru Gyakuten: Last Trial" (Japanese: 華麗なる逆転 Last Trial)	Yukiko Imai	March 30, 2019
Noticing that Maya was able to identify the true culprit in the dark, Phoenix deduces that the killer is Godot, whose red visor not only glows in the dark but also leaves him unable to see anything red, including the bloody message incriminating Maya. Asserting that Godot killed Elise in order to protect Maya, Phoenix reveals Godot's true identity as Diego, who was poisoned by Dahlia five years ago and was comatose until after Mia's death. Godot explains that he learned of Morgan's plan and worked alongside Elise to prevent Pearl from channeling Dahlia, leading Elise to channel her herself. Tasked with proving Godot guilty once and for all, Phoenix reveals that Godot was attacked by Dahlia when he stopped her, hiding the wound under his visor. Godot admits his guilt, realising that he himself had been the arrogant one. Forgiving Phoenix, Godot accepts him as Mia's successor. Iris reveals that she had played the role of Dahlia while acting as Phoenix's girlfriend years ago, leading Phoenix to realise the kindness he felt from her back then wasn't a lie.

== Media release ==
In Japan, the series received a home media release by Aniplex. The first box set was released on DVD and Blu-ray on August 24, 2016, and includes the first thirteen episodes and Vol. 1 of the series' original soundtrack. The second box set was released on December 21, 2016, and includes episodes 14-24 and Vol. 2 of the series' soundtrack.
