= Will Power (disambiguation) =

Will Power (born 1981) is an Australian motorsport driver.

Will Power may also refer to:

- Will Power (performer), American actor, rapper, playwright, and educator
- Will Power (TV series), a 2013 drama series
- Will Power (album), a 1987 album by Joe Jackson
- Will Power (film), a 1913 silent American short comedy film
- "Will Power", a song by DC Talk from the 1992 album Free at Last

== See also ==
- Will Powers, stagename for Lynn Goldsmith
- Will Powers, fictional character from Ace Attorney, see List of Ace Attorney characters
- Powerhouse Hobbs, ring name of professional wrestler William Hobson
- William Power (disambiguation)
- Willpower (disambiguation)
- Power (disambiguation)
- Will (disambiguation)
