= List of psychological schools =

The psychological schools are the great classical theories of psychology. Each has been highly influential; however, most psychologists hold eclectic viewpoints that combine aspects of each school.

== Most influential ==
The most influential ones and their main founders are::

- Behaviorism: John B. Watson
- Cognitivism: Aaron T. Beck, Albert Ellis
- Functionalism: William James
- Humanistic/Gestalt: Max Wertheimer
- Psychoanalytic school: Sigmund Freud
- Systems psychology: Gregory Bateson, Felix Guattari

== Complete list ==
The list below includes these, and other, influential schools of thought in psychology:

- Activity-oriented approach
- Analytical psychology
- Anomalistic psychology
- Anti-psychiatry
- Associationism
- Behaviorism (see also radical behaviorism)
- Behavioural genetics
- Bioenergetics
- Biological psychology
- Biopsychosocial model
- Chicken Soup for the Soul
- Clinical psychology
- Cognitivism
- Constructivism
- Cultural-historical psychology
- Depth psychology
- Descriptive psychology
- Developmental psychology
- Ecological psychology
- Ecological systems theory
- Ecopsychology
- Ego psychology
- Environmental psychology
- Evolutionary psychology
- Existential psychology
- Experimental analysis of behavior - the school descended from B.F. Skinner's work
- Functionalism
- Gestalt psychology
- Gestalt therapy
- Humanistic psychology
- Hypnosis
- Individual psychology
- Industrial psychology
- Liberation psychology
- Logotherapy
- Organismic psychology
- Organizational psychology
- Phenomenological psychology
- Process psychology
- Psychoanalysis
- Psychohistory
- Psychology of self
- Radical behaviorism - often considered a school of philosophy, not psychology
- Social psychology (sociocultural psychology)
- Strength-based practice
- Structuralism
- Systems psychology
- Transactional analysis
- Transpersonal psychology
- Willpower (Volition)

== See also ==
- History of psychology
