= William Powers =

William Powers may refer to:

- William Powers Jr. (1946–2019), former president of the University of Texas at Austin
- William T. Powers (1926–2013), scientist associated with perceptual control theory
- William T. Powers (industrialist) (1820–1909), manufacturer and capitalist
- William Powers (writer) (born 1961), American writer, journalist and technologist
- William Powers (politician) (active 1991–2001), former New York state Republican Party chairman
- William F. Powers (born 1940), vice president of research for the Ford Motor Company
- William W. Powers, member of the Illinois House of Representatives
- Bill Powers (American politician) (born 1957), member of Tennessee General Assembly

== See also ==
- Will Powers, stagename for Lynn Goldsmith (born 1948)
- Will Powers, fictional character from Ace Attorney, see List of Ace Attorney characters
- William Power (disambiguation)
- William (disambiguation)
- Powers (disambiguation)
