= Ace Attorney (TV series) =

2016 television series directed by Ayumu Watanabe

- Key visual depicting the main cast
- 逆転裁判 ～その「真実」、異議あり！～ Gyakuten Saiban: Sono "Shinjitsu", Igiari!
- Type: TV series
- Genre: Legal drama, mystery
- Based on: Ace Attorney by Capcom
- Directed by: Ayumu Watanabe
- Series composition: Atsuhiro Tomioka
- Music by: Kaoru Wada
- Voices of: Masashi Tamaki; Yuki Kaji; Aoi Yuuki; Saori Yumiba; Ben Hiura
- No. of episodes: 47 (list of episodes)

Production
- Studios: A-1 Pictures (season 1); CloverWorks (season 2) (Note: The second season was originally credited to A-1 Pictures. However, the credit was transferred to CloverWorks after their separation from the studio in October 2018.)

Original release
- Network: NNS (ytv)
- Release: April 2, 2016 – March 30, 2019

Related
- Manga
- Written by: Naoyuki Kageyama
- Published by: Shueisha
- Magazine: V Jump
- Original run: March 19, 2016 – July 21, 2017
- Volumes: 3

Ace Attorney, known in Japan as Gyakuten Saiban: Sono "Shinjitsu", Igiari! (Japanese: 逆転裁判 ～その「真実」、異議あり！～; lit. "Turnabout Trial: I Object to That 'Truth'!"), is a mystery anime series produced by A-1 Pictures, based on Capcom's video game series of the same name. It is directed by Ayumu Watanabe and written by Atsuhiro Tomioka, with Ace Attorney creator Shu Takumi serving as a script supervisor. The first season—which adapts the first two games of the franchise, Phoenix Wright: Ace Attorney and Justice for All—aired in Japan from April to September 2016, and was simulcast by Crunchyroll. A second season by CloverWorks aired from October 2018 to March 2019, adapting the third game, Trials and Tribulations.

== Premise ==
Based on the first three video games in the series, Ace Attorney takes place in an alternate world where the court system has been changed to the point where trials held in first instance and courts must reach a verdict within three days. Phoenix Wright is a rookie defense lawyer who works under his mentor, Mia Fey. When Mia is murdered, Phoenix befriends her younger sister Maya, a spirit medium-in-training who can channel the spirits of the dead. Joined by Maya, Phoenix heads up the Wright & Co. Law Offices and stands up to defend his clients in court, often butting heads with several prosecutors, most notably his childhood friend Miles Edgeworth.

== Episodes ==
Season	Episodes	Originally released	
Season	Episodes	First released	Last released
1	24	April 2, 2016	September 24, 2016
2	23	October 6, 2018	March 30, 2019

== Production and release ==
Ace Attorney's anime adaptation was first announced during a presentation at the 2015 Tokyo Game Show. Production of the series was handled by A-1 Pictures, who had previously produced the animated cutscenes in the sixth main Ace Attorney game, Spirit of Justice, and was directed by Ayumu Watanabe with series composition by Atsuhiro Tomioka and character design by Keiko Ōta and Koji Watanabe. The first season adapts the first two video games in the franchise, Phoenix Wright: Ace Attorney and Justice for All, alongside an original episode, though the cases "Rise from the Ashes", added to the DS release of the former game, and "The Lost Turnabout", the opening case of the latter, are omitted. Ace Attorney creator Shu Takumi also acted as a script supervisor for the series.

The opening theme of the first 13 episodes is "Gyakuten Winner" (逆転Winner; lit. "Turnabout Winner") by Johnny's West while the ending theme is "Message" by Rei Yasuda. From episode 14–24, the opening theme is "Jinsei wa Subarashii" (人生は素晴らしい; lit. "Life Is Wonderful") by Johnny's West, while the ending theme is "Jun'ai Chaos" (純愛カオス, Jun'ai Kaosu; lit. "Pure Love Chaos") by Tokyo Performance Doll.

The anime began airing on NNS across Japan from April 2, 2016, replacing Kindaichi Case Files R in its initial timeslot. The series was simulcast by Crunchyroll, with multiple subtitle tracks featuring both the original Japanese names and localized English names. Funimation distributed the series in North America and released the first Blu-ray and DVD set on January 23, 2018.

A second season by CloverWorks adapts the third game in the franchise, Trials and Tribulations, as well as "The Lost Turnabout", the only remaining case from the original games that was not adapted in the first season, alongside several original stories. The season aired from October 6, 2018, to March 30, 2019, with many of the original production staff retained and Takumi returning as a collaborator. For the first twelve episodes of the season, the opening theme is "Never Lose" by Tomohisa Yamashita, while the ending theme is "Starting Blue" (スターティングブルー) by Halca. From episode thirteen onwards, the opening theme is "Reason" by Yamashita while the ending theme is "Beautiful Days" (ビューティフルデイズ) by Coalamode. A one-hour special aired on January 19, 2019. Funimation produced an English dub as it aired.

A manga adaptation by Naoyuki Kageyama was serialized in Shueisha's V-Jump magazine from March 2016 to July 2017. It has also been collected into three volumes.

== Reception ==
Jacob Chapman of Anime News Network said that popular reception was "subdued at best and outraged at worst, in ways usually reserved for radically altered adaptations". Chapman was critical of the animation quality, calling it "constantly off-model and slideshow-minimal but still watchable at least", whilst being more receptive to the adaptation's faithful recreation of the game's events and removal of "extraneous gags and details". He added that while the adaptation "[does] its best to adapt in beneficial ways", it fails to replicate the "surprisingly powerful impact" of playing the games and experiencing the characters' intricacies firsthand.
