= Willpower =

Willpower or will power may refer to:

== Common usage ==
- Self-control, training and control of oneself and one's conduct, usually for personal improvement
- Volition (psychology), the process of making and acting on decisions
- Will (philosophy), a philosophical concept
- Will to power, a philosophical concept by Friedrich Nietzsche

== People ==
- Will Power (born 1981), Australian racing driver
- Will Power (performer)

== Culture ==
- Willpower: Rediscovering the Greatest Human Strength, a book by psychologist Roy F. Baumeister
- Will Power (TV series), TVB Drama, 2013
- WLPWR, a band from South Carolina
- Willpower (Today Is the Day album), 1994
- #willpower (will.i.am album), 2013

== Other uses ==
- Willpower paradox

== See also ==
- Will Power (disambiguation)
- William Power (disambiguation)
