= William Power =

William Power may refer to:

== Australia ==
- Bill Power (Australian politician) (1893–1974), member of the Queensland Legislative Assembly
- William Grene Power (1835–1903), member of the Queensland Legislative Council
- Will Power (born 1981), Australian motorsport racer
- Bill Power (footballer) (1937–2020), Australian rules footballer who played with South Melbourne
- Billy Power (footballer) (1917–2002), Australian rules footballer who played with Footscray

== Canada ==
- William Power (Canadian politician) (1849–1920), member of the Canadian House of Commons
- William Gerard Power (1882–1940), his son, Canadian politician in Quebec
- William Power (Quebec judge) (1800–1860), judge and political figure in Lower Canada
- William Edward Power (died 2003), Roman Catholic Bishop of Antigonish, 1960–1986
- William Patrick Power (1843–1919), Canadian priest and head of Duquesne University

== United Kingdom ==
- William Power (Scottish politician) (1873–1951), leader of the Scottish National Party
- William Henry Power (1842–1916), Chief Medical Officer of England
- William Power, member of the Birmingham Six

== United States ==
- William Patrick Power (1843–1919), first rector of the Pittsburgh Catholic College
- Will Power (performer), American actor, rapper and playwright
- Bill Power (outlaw), member of the Dalton Gang

== See also ==
- William Powers (disambiguation)
- Will Power (disambiguation)
