= List of Ace Attorney characters =

Several of the series' characters, from left to right: Back – Larry Butz Middle – Ema Skye, Kristoph Gavin, Dick Gumshoe (with Missile), Miles Edgeworth, Phoenix Wright, Apollo Justice, Trucy Wright (with Mr. Hat), Franziska von Karma, Godot Front – Klavier Gavin, Pearl Fey, Maya Fey

Ace Attorney is a series of legal thriller comedy-drama adventure/visual novel games created by Shu Takumi. Players assume the role of a defense attorney in a fictional courtroom setting in the main series. Published by Capcom, the series includes Phoenix Wright: Ace Attorney, Phoenix Wright: Ace Attorney – Justice for All, Phoenix Wright: Ace Attorney – Trials and Tribulations, Apollo Justice: Ace Attorney, Ace Attorney Investigations: Miles Edgeworth, Ace Attorney Investigations 2: Prosecutor's Gambit, Professor Layton vs. Phoenix Wright: Ace Attorney, Phoenix Wright: Ace Attorney – Dual Destinies, The Great Ace Attorney: Adventures, Phoenix Wright: Ace Attorney – Spirit of Justice, and The Great Ace Attorney 2: Resolve. Character names for the English release of the series were changed significantly from the original Japanese release.

== Main characters ==
=== Phoenix Wright ===
Phoenix Wright (成歩堂 龍一, Naruhodō Ryūichi) is a defense attorney and the main character of the franchise, and the protagonist in all games in the main series, except for Apollo Justice.

=== Mia Fey ===
Voiced by (English): Christina Katano (AA3); Colleen Clinkenbeard (anime)
Voiced by (Japanese): Miyuki Kawahara (AA3); Chie Nakamura (anime)

Mia Fey (綾里 千尋, Ayasato Chihiro) first appeared in Phoenix Wright: Ace Attorney as Phoenix's boss and mentor at Fey and Co. Law Offices, assisting him before she is murdered and her sister, Maya Fey, framed for the crime. Phoenix successfully defends Maya, and learns of both sisters having spirit channeling powers, with Maya managing to channel Mia. Mia is channeled through Maya and later their cousin Pearl Fey at various points during the series' story. In Phoenix Wright: Ace Attorney – Justice for All, Mia again assists Phoenix in proving Maya's innocence after their aunt, Morgan Fey, frames Maya for murder in order to have Maya replaced as the master of the spirit channeling technique by Pearl. Mia appears again in Phoenix Wright: Ace Attorney – Trials and Tribulations, where her backstory is explored, particularly her defending Phoenix for murder and proving a woman named Dahlia Hawthorne was the true culprit. It is later revealed that Dahlia was involved in her first trial, causing the death of her defendant and getting away with her crimes before also poisoning her lover, Diego Armando. She later assists Phoenix in defeating Dahlia after Dahlia attempts a plot to kill Maya.

Mia was created by the series' creator, Shu Takumi. Originally, Takumi planned to have Mia's law office consist of a protagonist, helper, and mentor, but this changed when Takumi's boss told him to remove one, arguing that three was too many. Takumi did not want to do this, choosing to handle it by having Mia die and exist as a spirit through a spirit medium, saying that this would end up being two characters. He stated that he considered having Mia be a spirit from the very beginning of the game, and positive reception during development spurred on this idea. The first trial was intended to be about the murder of Phoenix's mentor with Phoenix as the defendant, but this was scrapped with the idea being that the death wouldn't have an impact if the player had not met the mentor before. Thus, he introduced a new prologue with the mentor assisting Phoenix in his defense. The spirit medium angle was planned to be used only in the first game, but expanded this aspect in the second and third games, where the third entry became centered around spirit mediums. Takumi expressed worry, when designing her younger self for Trials and Tribulations, about pulling it off properly. When designing the fourth episode of Trials and Tribulations, Takumi wanted Mia to face off against Edgeworth, but experienced complications due to both having not lost a case before. He ultimately decided to have defendant Terry Fawles commit suicide during court in order for the trial to end without a verdict in order to deal with this.

Mia was designed by Tatsurō Iwamoto, who originally conceived her as an older man wearing a geta. They decided to change this after determining that too many of the characters were old men, causing them to change Phoenix's mentor character to be a young woman. The original old man design was repurposed for the Judge's design. When designing Maya in Phoenix Wright: Ace Attorney – Spirit of Justice, the game's character artist, Takuro Fuse, considered making her resemble Mia now that she is grown up, ultimately coming up with a design that felt similar to Mia's while attempting to not lose Maya's charm. The theme song for Maya and Mia, "Turnabout Sisters Ballad," was originally written to be cheerier, but once Mia's death was written, the song was changed by adding a semitonal chord shift to the main part of the song to express sadness.

Mia Fey has received generally positive reception. Dengeki writer Ayana felt that her words to Phoenix, to reverse his way of thinking, resonated with her, feeling that being able to change one's way of thinking was a valuable quality in all walks of life. Eurogamer writer Jay Castello, while discussing their desire to become a lawyer as a teenager, stated that Mia was the character who drove this desire. They called her "compassionate, dedicated, and hyper-competent," and that she was the kind of person they aspired to be. Fellow Eurogamer writer John Walker called her a "wonderful" character, enjoying her presence in the game while expressing that he had a lot of affection for her as a female video game character. Game Revolution writer Joe Dodson discussed her sexuality, particularly noting that her breasts were particularly large and commenting on how weird it is that she can possess Pearl, an eight-year-old, giving her breasts. Nintendo Life writer Kate Gray also commented on Mia's design when channeled by Pearl, calling it creepy. On Mia's character, she felt that Mia's death was meant to teach players not to take anything for granted, comparing this scene to a later case where Phoenix's client turns out to be guilty. She felt that this twist was written with the idea that you'd grown complacent. On Mia, she discussed whether Mia falls under the women in refrigerators writing trope, where women are killed, abused, or otherwise harmed as a motivation for the player or protagonist. She argued that while she fit this trope, she doesn't "stay in the fridge," stating that she remains "strong, powerful, and utterly unfazed by her own murder," as well as a superior lawyer to Phoenix.

=== Miles Edgeworth ===
Miles Edgeworth (御剣 怜侍, Mitsurugi Reiji) is Phoenix Wright's long-time friend and first rival in the court room. He is temporarily playable in Phoenix Wright: Ace Attorney – Trials and Tribulations and the main player character in Ace Attorney Investigations: Miles Edgeworth and Ace Attorney Investigations 2: Prosecutor's Gambit. As a child, Edgeworth aspired to become a defense attorney, following in his father Gregory Edgeworth's footsteps. When they were children, Edgeworth successfully defended Phoenix in a classroom trial, where Phoenix was accused of stealing lunch money from Edgeworth himself. However, upon witnessing his father's death and watching in horror as the suspected murderer was let free, he gained a hatred for criminals and began studying to be a prosecutor, learning tactics from his mentor Manfred von Karma to always get a "guilty" verdict. This later earned him the name "demon prosecutor". Miles had not lost a case he was involved with until his first trial against Phoenix, after which he felt a need to defeat Phoenix. By the end of the first game, Miles would undergo some self-reflection, and eventually cast aside his traumas to become a more well-rounded and just prosecutor, instead of just chasing guilty verdicts.

Edgeworth's spin-off game Ace Attorney Investigations was originally going to star Ema Skye, another character from the series, but due to fan response, they went with Miles Edgeworth, a more popular character. The decision for Investigations to star Edgeworth specifically was partially driven by fan request.

=== Maya Fey ===
Maya Fey (綾里 真宵, Ayasato Mayoi) is a spirit medium and the younger sister of Phoenix's boss, Mia Fey. Maya is introduced in Phoenix Wright: Ace Attorney, in which she is accused of her sister's murder and defended by Phoenix. She becomes his legal assistant and investigates cases with him in the first three Ace Attorney games. Maya cheerily banters with Phoenix during investigations, and can channel her sister's spirit when Phoenix needs her help. She does not appear in the fourth and fifth games, but returns in the sixth, reuniting with Phoenix in Khura'in as she prepares to complete her channeling training. Maya also appears in other franchise media: the manga, film, anime series, and the spin-off games including the Professor Layton crossover and Ace Attorney Investigations. Maya, alongside Phoenix, also makes cameo appearances in several games across other genres.

=== Pearl Fey ===
Voiced by (English): Alexis Tipton (anime)
Voiced by (Japanese): Misaki Kuno (anime)

Pearl Fey (綾里 春美, Ayasato Harumi) first appears in Phoenix Wright: Ace Attorney – Justice for All, where she is introduced as the sheltered younger cousin of spirit medium and investigative assistant Maya Fey and a member of the Fey clan, a family of spirit mediums living in the isolated mountain town of Kurain Village. A spirit medium herself, after her mother Morgan Fey attempts to have Maya framed for murder in order to have Pearl succeed Maya as the Master of Kurain, Pearl channels her deceased cousin and defense attorney Mia Fey so she can guide Phoenix Wright in clearing her cousin's name and exposing Morgan's crimes. Afterwards, Pearl often accompanies Phoenix and Maya, whom she views as each holding romantic interest towards the other (as their "special someone"), because of her sheltered upbringing. At one point, they take Pearl to the Berry Big Circus. Nine months after her mother's arrest, Pearl, Maya and Phoenix are invited to an awards show at the Gatewater Imperial Hotel, where Maya is kidnapped by notorious hired hitman Shelly de Killer and Phoenix is made to defend his employer Matt Engarde and have him receive a "not guilty" verdict as ransom. Pearl and Maya subsequently each separately channel Mia to allow her to pass information about where Maya is being held to Phoenix, allowing them to turn De Killer against Engarde during his trial and have Engarde plead "guilty", allowing for Maya's release. Pearl additionally displays her athletic abilities in being able to run from the mountaintop Kurain Village to Los Angeles in under five hours, a distance taking two hours to travel by train.

Pearl returns in Phoenix Wright: Ace Attorney – Trials and Tribulations, seeing the Sacred Urn she had previously broken displayed at a department store, before it is stolen by the infamous thief Mask☆DeMasque, a.k.a. Ron DeLite. After Phoenix clears Ron of both his true theft charges and untrue murder charges, Ron's wife Desirée hugs him, leading to Pearl, having just arrived on the scene, knocking Phoenix out, after mistakenly believing him to have been cheating on Maya. Sometime later, after visiting her mother in prison and travelling with Phoenix and Maya to a mountain retreat, Pearl is tricked by her mother into attempting to channel her deceased half-sister Dahlia Hawthorne to have her kill Maya, only to be saved by her aunt, Misty Fey, who had disappeared many years prior, and Mia's former boyfriend Godot, who had been rendered comatose many years prior. Later, while Pearl's other half-sister Iris is accused of Misty's murder, Pearl confronts Franziska von Karma over her poor treatment of Maya, rendering her speechless, before once again channeling Mia to help Phoenix in court. In the aftermath of the trial, Pearl returns to the temple in tears to clean up gravy she had spilled on Misty's portrait; Phoenix and Maya then catch up with her, reassuring her that she is not to blame for the events that occurred.

Pearl does not make a physical appearance in the series' fourth entry; however, she is briefly referenced in dialogue by Phoenix in Apollo Justice: Ace Attorney. By Phoenix Wright: Ace Attorney – Dual Destinies, set eight years after Trials and Tribulations, Pearl is a high school student, regularly keeping in touch with Phoenix and his legally adopted daughter Trucy Wright, who sees her as her "big sister." After Phoenix's new protégé Athena Cykes is arrested, Pearl visits Phoenix on her regular route to clean his office and deliver him a letter from Maya, before accompanying him in proving Athena innocent of her mother's murder, and comforts Athena after Phoenix breaks the black Psyche-Locks on her subconscious mind, representing repressed memories of secrets. In the game's DLC case, set several months earlier, Pearl is visiting Shipshape Aquarium with her summer camp before being questioned by police after the aquarium's owner is apparently murdered. Subsequently, Pearl runs into Phoenix and Athena, introducing herself to the latter before recharging Phoenix's magatama, it having finally run out of spiritual energy after she had first charged it for him upon meeting him nine years prior. After an orca and subsequently their trainer are accused of the murder, Pearl assists Phoenix and Athena in their investigation, retrieving forensics equipment Phoenix had previously received from Ema Skye. Months after the trial's conclusion (the death having been proven to be accidental in nature), Pearl revisits the aquarium with Phoenix, Athena, Trucy, and Apollo Justice.

In Phoenix Wright: Ace Attorney – Spirit of Justice, Pearl briefly appears in Kurain Village after Apollo visits it with his deceased adoptive father Dhurke Sahdmadhi (channeled by Maya), providing them with directions to a cave they were searching for. After Maya finally returns from her medium studies in the Kingdom of Khura'in, she is greeted by Pearl, who unsuccessfully pitches the concept of allowing clothing stores to set up in the town. In the non-canon DLC case Asinine Attorney, Pearl appears on vacation in the Kingdom of Khu'rain, briefly impersonating royal priestess Rayfa Padma Khura'in to prevent them from being kidnapped.

Outside of the main Ace Attorney series, Pearl makes a brief cameo appearance in the Ace Attorney Investigations: Miles Edgeworth spin-off title, also appearing in several other Capcom titles, including as an unlockable costume in We Love Golf! and as a collectible card in Teppen: Ace vs. The People.

Pearl has appeared in other media adaptations of Ace Attorney. She is a recurring character in the Ace Attorney manga series published by Kodansha Comics, and in a stage play based on the case Farewell, My Turnabout, portrayed by Shiyū Urushibara with understudy Yūna Takano. Pearl also appears in the Ace Attorney anime series, which adapts the events of the original trilogy.

Initially, Pearl would have been a snooty rival of Maya exclusive to one case and of the same age as her, but an unknown designer suggested Pearl be younger than Maya as it would have been more dramatic. When Takumi attempted to write a little girl character, he found her to be surprisingly cute and decided to include her in more than the second case.

=== Dick Gumshoe ===
Portrayed by: Shunsuke Daito (film)
Voiced by (English): Bryan Massey
Voiced by (Japanese): Masami Iwasaki

Dick Gumshoe (糸鋸 圭介, Itonokogiri Keisuke) is a homicide detective of the local police department. Despite his occupation, he is a clumsy and forgetful man who is largely seen as incompetent by the prosecutors, frequently resulting in his salary being lowered. As a result, he lives in poor circumstances. Despite this, he is a friendly man who is determined to find the killer and is fiercely loyal to Miles Edgeworth, and eventually comes to be a trusted ally of Phoenix Wright as well.

Shu Takumi claims he had barely any backstory written for Gumshoe. Instead, Gumshoe's personality and character "fell into place" after deciding on having "pal" at the end of each of his sentences, with some being added as the story went on, such as the salary cutting gag. The red pencil behind his left ear is a holdover from when he would have horse racing as his hobby. The rookie version of Gumshoe that appears in Trials and Tribulations would have originally been significantly different in terms of design, with him only having one hair spike and his tie neatly tied tight. In the final game, he only has a new coat to differentiate himself.

=== Franziska von Karma ===
Voiced by (English): Janet Hsu (AA2-AAI2); Jessica Peterson (anime)
Voiced by (Japanese): Yukari Suwabe (AA2-AAI2); Saori Yumiba (anime)

Franziska von Karma (狩魔 冥, Karuma Mei) is a prosecuting attorney and the daughter of Manfred von Karma.

Franziska first appears in Justice for All as an antagonist to protagonist Phoenix Wright, specifically in the second episode. She is a prodigy prosecuting attorney, becoming an attorney in Germany at the age of 13, going undefeated until she was 18. She seeks to get revenge on Phoenix, who presumes this to be because he defeated her father, Manfred von Karma. She is typically seen holding a whip and using it on others, in and out of court. She tends to use the word "fool" to describe others, and has a cold personality. Phoenix defeats her in two trials, causing her great frustration. In the original Japanese version of the game, she lived in the United States rather than Germany.

=== Ema Skye ===
Voiced by (English): Erica Lindbeck
Voiced by (Japanese): Marina Inoue

Ema Skye (宝月 茜, Hōzuki Akane) is the younger sister of Chief Prosecutor Lana Skye and has hopes of becoming a scientific investigator. She first approaches Phoenix's office to obtain a defense attorney for her sister, Lana. Though he ignored most of the cases he received during Maya's two-month absence, he took Ema's due to her resemblance to Maya in personality and appearance. The kanji for her Japanese surname, Hōzuki, translates to "treasured moon" or "jeweled moon". She was included in the video game Apollo Justice: Ace Attorney due to the developers' desire to bring back some familiar faces to it, where she became a homicide detective after failing to qualify for her dream job. As a result, she became moodier and addicted to a chocolate treat called "Snackoos." In Spirit of Justice, she finally passed the test to become a forensic investigator and lightens up. Ace Attorney Investigations: Miles Edgeworth was originally to star Ema Skye, but due to the response from the fanbase, they chose to replace her with Miles Edgeworth, who was a much more popular character. Instead, she was featured as a secondary character in both Investigations games.

=== The Judge ===
Portrayed by: Akira Emoto (film)
Voiced by (English): Kent Williams (anime)
Voiced by (Japanese): Kanehira Yamamoto (UMvC3); Bunmei Tobayama (AA5); Ben Hiura (anime)

The unnamed Judge (裁判長, Saibanchō) presides over the vast majority of trials shown in the Ace Attorney series. He is a naïve older man whose age and poor hearing lead to him misunderstanding statements in court. He will penalize the defense if they present incorrect evidence, at times even increasing the severity of the penalty. If the player incurs too many penalties, the game will end and their client will typically be found guilty. He is easily swayed by arguments, which both the defense and prosecution will use to their advantage.

In spite of his foibles, he is said to always hand down the correct verdict, earning him the nickname, "The Great Judgini." While this is true in his onscreen trials, it is usually thanks to the attorneys rather than himself. He has a younger brother, also a judge, who behaves similarly and uses Canadian slang.

The Judge is a fixture of the Ace Attorney series, appearing in every mainline game, being the only character except for Phoenix to do so. Even in the spinoff games where he does not appear (such as The Great Ace Attorney), there is often a counterpart to him with a similar design and appearance.

Originally, the Judge would not have appeared in the nightmare Phoenix has during the events of Justice for All, with it being a demon inspired by Devil May Cry 1. The Judge's younger brother was made Canadian as a decision from localization director Andrew Alfonso.

=== Apollo Justice ===
Voiced by (English): JP Kellams (AA4); Orion Acaba (AA5-AA6)
Voiced by (Japanese): Kōtarō Ogiwara (AA4); KENN (AA5-AA6)

Apollo Justice (王泥喜 法介, Odoroki Hōsuke) is the main protagonist in Apollo Justice: Ace Attorney and is a major playable character in Dual Destinies and Spirit of Justice. He is a defense attorney and was Phoenix Wright's understudy in the three games in which he appears. He was born in 2003 to Jove Justice and Thalassa Gramarye (thus also being Trucy Wright's biological half-brother), though after the former's death in 2005, he was adopted by Dhurke Sahdmadhi, a defense attorney at the time, and was raised alongside Sahdmadhi's son Nahyuta in the Kingdom of Khura'in. In 2012, Justice was sent to a boarding school in America, where he met his best friend Clay Terran, an aspiring astronaut.

In April 2026, he defended his first client, Phoenix Wright, in court under the supervision of his mentor Kristoph Gavin; however, this trial ended in Gavin's conviction as the true perpetrator of the crime. Two months later, he joins the Wright Talent Agency, which is then renamed the Wright Anything Agency, and defends three more clients against his former mentor's brother, prosecutor Klavier Gavin. While defending the last of these clients, Justice proves that Kristoph Gavin was behind the forgery that led to Wright's disbarment, allowing Wright to retake the bar exam and become a defense attorney again in July 2027.

In December 2027, his best friend, Clay Terran (葵 大地, Aoi Daichi), is murdered at the Cosmos Space Center. Suspicious of his coworker, Athena Cykes, Justice temporarily leaves the agency in order to investigate the murder alone. However, after Wright proves Cykes's innocence in court and identifies the true culprit (who is immediately shot by an unidentified sniper), Justice resumes work at the agency.

In April 2028, he meets Nahyuta Sahdmadhi, who is now a prosecutor, for the first time in fifteen years. Justice successfully defends Trucy Wright against Sahdmadhi; however, one month later, after successfully defending Dhurke Sahdmadhi in a civil case against Phoenix Wright, he returns to Khura'in and is once again reunited with the prosecutor. There, he successfully defends his foster father against two counts of murder. However, during the trial, he learns that Dhurke was actually murdered himself just days prior, and was being channeled by Maya Fey in the intervening time. The trial results in Queen Ga'ran's deposition, and Justice decides to stay in Khura'in to run Dhurke's old law office, now known as the Justice Law Offices.

=== Trucy Wright ===
Voiced by (English): Kira Buckland
Voiced by (Japanese): Chieko Higuchi

Trucy Wright (成歩堂 みぬき, Naruhodō Minuki), born Trucy Enigmar (奈々伏 みぬき, Nanafushi Minuki), is Phoenix Wright's adoptive daughter, introduced in Apollo Justice: Ace Attorney. She is a stage magician and accompanies Apollo on his investigations.

=== Athena Cykes ===
Voiced by (English): Wendee Lee
Voiced by (Japanese): Megumi Han

Athena Cykes (希月 心音, Kizuki Kokone) is a defense attorney and a specialist in analytical psychology. She first appears in Dual Destinies as one of the three player characters.

Using her portable computer, Widget (モニ太, Monita), she is able to access the Mood Matrix, detecting emotions from testimonies to uncover obscured facts. She often serves as co-counsel to Apollo or Phoenix, only being in charge of two separate trials herself thus far.

=== Ryunosuke Naruhodo ===
Voiced by (English): Mark Ota
Voiced by (Japanese): Hiro Shimono

Ryunosuke Naruhodo (成歩堂 龍ノ介, Naruhodō Ryūnosuke) is the protagonist of the Great Ace Attorney games. He is an ancestor of Phoenix Wright who lived in Japan during the Meiji Era. His first brush with law was as a student of Yumei University when he was accused of murdering a British professor. Although not initially a law student, he traveled to Great Britain in an effort to learn from their legal system. Like his descendant, he believes his goal as a lawyer is to find out the truth of any given case.

Ash Parrish of Kotaku stated that they were satisfied that the ideals sowed by Ryunosuke would later be reaped by Phoenix Wright, who then passed it down to Apollo Justice and Athena Cykes. Parrish did believe, however, that the game would improve had Herlock Sholmes and Ryunosuke Naruhodo had been cut in favor of Susato Mikotoba and Iris Wilson. Malindy Hetfeld at Eurogamer found that there was not much to learn about him and that he was rather passive, attributing this to him having only Sholmes and Susato to bounce off of.

=== Susato Mikotoba ===
Voiced by (English): Rina Takasaki
Voiced by (Japanese): Kana Hanazawa

Susato Mikotoba (御琴羽 寿沙都, Mikotoba Susato) is a judicial assistant who often helps Ryunosuke in his cases. She is described by Capcom as a yamato nadeshiko (a personification of the image of the ideal Japanese woman), a progressive dreamer, and a lover of foreign mystery novels. She often finds helpful information within a book she carries around.

Following the events of Adventures, Susato returns to Japan and becomes a lawyer in spite of a ban on women practicing law in the country, adopting the male persona of Ryutaro Naruhodo (成歩堂 龍太郎, Naruhodō Ryūtarō) in order to defend her best friend, Rei Membami (村雨 葉織, Murasame Haori).

In contrast to a majority of assistants in the series, Susato is actually more knowledgeable on law than her older attorney counterpart, having studied the subject from a young age.

=== Herlock Sholmes ===
Voiced by (English): Bradley Clarkson
Voiced by (Japanese): Shinji Kawada

Herlock Sholmes (シャーロック・ホームズ, Shārokku Hōmuzu; Sherlock Holmes) is a famous detective who frequently assists Naruhodo in his cases with both his inventions and rapid-fire abductive reasoning. He is also the titular star of a series of mystery novels based on actual cases he has completed.

He often puts his reasoning to the test during investigations, which Ryunosuke ends up correcting during the "dance of deduction" segments of the game. Sholmes is also roommates with Naruhodo and Susato during their stay in Great Britain, with them occupying the attic in his flat.

Ash Parrish of Kotaku would "welcome his complete removal", believing him to be an ungreat detective who requires the assistance of Ryunosuke to solve all of his mistakes. Game Informer wrote that Sholmes gave some head shaking moments, but that his denseness also made for a charming character.

=== Iris Wilson ===
Voiced by (English): Claire Morgan
Voiced by (Japanese): Misaki Kuno

Iris Wilson (アイリス・ワトソン, Airisu Watoson; Iris Watson) is the assistant and adoptive daughter of Herlock Sholmes. She is a child prodigy, most notably penning 'The Adventures of Herlock Sholmes' and holding a medical degree at the age of 10. She is highly clever and perceptive, but simultaneously has a childlike level of innocence. Like Sholmes, she frequently assists Ryunosuke in the investigative portion of his cases, and even once stood alongside him in court.

Iris was listed as the favorite character of Game Informer writer Kimberly Wallace. Iris Wilson's theme received praise from Adventure Gamers, describing it as "high-energy, cheery-tempoed whimsy".

=== Barok van Zieks ===
Voiced by (English): Robert Vernon
Voiced by (Japanese): Kenjirō Tsuda

Barok van Zieks (バロック・バンジークス, Barokku Banjīkusu) is a feared prosecutor in Great Britain. He has earned the moniker 'Reaper of the Bailey' with a majority of those he prosecutes dying after the trial, regardless of whether or not their guilt was proven in court.

van Zieks often crushes glasses of wine in his hands and flashes the heels of his high end boots in court. He is notably bigoted towards the Japanese, though he grows to respect Ryunosuke during their many trials against each other.

van Zieks's racism drew ire from The Escapist, and ended up irritated that the game "almost [implies] that van Zieks's racism is understandable because he believed Genshin Asogi killed his older brother." Kotaku attributed van Zieks' racism to a wider reoccurring theme of such, which overall was believed to be a bad decision. Destructoid writer Eric van Allen described van Zieks as "expressive and imposing". Adventure Gamers stated that he "proves to be a most elegant and worthy opponent".

=== Kazuma Asogi ===
Voiced by (English): Ben Deery
Voiced by (Japanese): Yūichi Nakamura

Kazuma Asogi (亜双義 一真, Asōgi Kazuma) is Ryunosuke's best friend and a certified lawyer in Japan, having successfully passed their bar exam. He acts as Ryunosuke's co-counsel when he is tried for murder in Japan. He is wise and charismatic, and can always be seen with his katana.

He invites Ryunosuke to accompany him on a trip to Great Britain to study their legal system. Unfortunately, an incident aboard the ship they traveled on results in his presumed death. However, he later resurfaces in England, studying to be a prosecutor, eventually serving as such in the final trial of Resolve.

== Others ==
=== Recurring characters ===
==== Frank Sahwit ====
Portrayed by: Ayumu Saitō (film)
Voiced by (English): Ben Phillips
Voiced by (Japanese): Shinya Takahashi

Frank Sahwit (山野 星雄, Yamano Hoshio) was a thief posing as a newspaper salesman, he was the culprit in Phoenix Wright's first case.

==== Misty Fey ====
Portrayed by: Kimiko Yo (film)
Voiced by (English): Terri Doty
Voiced by (Japanese): Kaori Nakamura

Misty Fey (綾里 舞子, Ayasato Maiko) is the late mother of Maya and Mia Fey, she was contacted by the police to solve the DL-6 murder and went missing shortly afterwards due to being falsely accused of being a fraud.

==== Morgan Fey ====
Voiced by (English): Stephanie Young
Voiced by (Japanese): Shukuko Tsugawa

Morgan Fey (綾里 キミ子, Ayasato Kimiko) is the aunt of Mia and Maya Fey, the older sister of Misty and the mother of Dahlia Hawthorne, Iris and Pearl Fey.

Morgan speaks in an antiquated style in Japanese. This was particularly difficult for localization to translate into English.

==== Winston Payne ====
Portrayed by: Seminosuke Murasugi (film)
Voiced by (English): David Crislip (AA1-AA4); Gregory Lush (anime)
Voiced by (Japanese): Wataru Hama (AA1-AA4); Wataru Yokojima (anime)

Winston Payne (亜内 武文, Auchi Takefumi) is a prosecutor known as the "Rookie Killer" due to winning cases against novice lawyers. He was Phoenix Wright and Apollo Justice's first opponent, and the prosecutor on Mia Fey's second case. Payne appears in the first case of the first four mainline games.

==== Larry Butz ====
Portrayed by: Akiyoshi Nakao (film)
Voiced by (English): Josh Martin (anime); Steph Garrett (anime, young)
Voiced by (Japanese): Masaya Onosaka (AA6); Tōru Nara (anime)

Larry Butz (矢張 政志, Yahari Masashi) is the childhood friend of Phoenix Wright and Miles Edgeworth who always causes trouble. He was the defendant in Wright's first case as a lawyer. He later reappears in various other cases across the series, often accidentally stumbling upon significant clues which help decide the trial's outcome.

Initially, Larry would have been a normal 9-5 office worker who would have appeared only in the fourth case, but because he was added into the first episode when it was added after the fact, his character went through significant changes and became the Larry that appears in the final game.

==== Manfred von Karma ====
Portrayed by: Ryō Ishibashi (film)
Voiced by (English): Bill Jenkins (anime)
Voiced by (Japanese): Masukasu Sugimori (AA1); Akio Ōtsuka (anime)

Manfred von Karma (狩魔 豪, Karuma Gō) was a ruthless perfectionist prosecutor who maintained a perfect trial record for 40 years. He is the mentor of Miles Edgeworth and father of Franziska von Karma. He serves as the prosecutor in charge of the final case of the first game, and makes appearances in the Investigations sub-series during flashbacks to the past.

==== Wendy Oldbag ====
Portrayed by: Yoshiko Iseki (film)
Voiced by (English): Anastasia Muñoz
Voiced by (Japanese): Yū Sugimoto

Wendy Oldbag (大場 カオル, Ōba Kaoru) is an elderly security guard first seen working for Global Studios during the trial of Will Powers. She tends to give lengthy speeches and irritate both Wright and Edgeworth. She has been known to crush on younger men including Edgeworth, and the deceased actors, Jack Hammer and Juan Corrida.

She was supposed to appear in Trials and Tribulations, and ended up having just enough memory space to appear as a cameo at the very end. She would have had a lei around her neck to imply coming back from a vacation to Hawaii, but that was cut as well.

==== Will Powers ====
Voiced by (English): Chris Rager
Voiced by (Japanese): Shōta Yamamoto

Will Powers (荷星 三郎, Niboshi Saburō) is an actor under Global Studios, best known for the tokusatsu show, Steel Samurai. He was one of Wright's clients, having been accused of murdering Jack Hammer. He later served as a witness for the trial of Matt Engarde.

Penny Nichols

Penny Nichols (間宮 由美子, Mamiya Yumiko) is a part time assistant at Global Studios and a fan of the Steel Samurai series, even collecting cards from the show. She gave Phoenix Wright information at various points during his investigation of Global Studios.

==== Lotta Hart ====
Portrayed by: Mitsuki Tanimura (film)
Voiced by (English): Whitney Rodgers
Voiced by (Japanese): Reiko Takagi

Lotta Hart (大沢木 ナツミ, Ōsawagi Natsumi) is a fiery-tempered photographer with a thick southern accent. She is first seen in Gourd Lake, looking for the urban legend "Gourdy." Her photography abilities are often used to provide crucial evidence in the cases she gets caught up in.

==== Maggey Byrde ====
Voiced by (English): Dawn M. Bennett
Voiced by (Japanese): Yoshiko Ikuta

Maggey Byrde (須々木 マコ, Suzuki Mako) is a young woman with notably bad luck, which has resulted in her often needing to change jobs and having been accused of murder twice. Both times she was represented in court by Phoenix Wright, who ended up proving her innocence. She is friendly with Dick Gumshoe, who has a not-so-secret crush on her.

==== Shelly de Killer ====
Voiced by (English): Marcus D. Stimac
Voiced by (Japanese): Wataru Yokojima

The third in a line of professional hitmen, Shelly de Killer (虎狼死家 左々右エ門, Koroshiya Sazaemon) is known to leave his calling card to prevent the implication of his clients. He values client confidentially, being willing to cover for his clients as long as they do not betray him.

==== Adrian Andrews ====
Voiced by (English): Mallorie Rodak
Voiced by (Japanese): Ayaka Asai

Adrian Andrews (華宮 霧緒, Kamiya Kirio) is a young woman who first appeared as the manager for Matt Engarde. She later resurfaced as the director for the Kurain Village exhibit at the Lordy Tailor department store.

She has an air being of calm and collected, however in truth she is quite emotionally dependent on others. When she is too stressed out, her glasses will shatter in court, before being quickly replaced.

==== Marvin Grossberg ====
Voiced by (English): Phil Parsons
Voiced by (Japanese): Ryō Sugisaki

Marvin Grossberg (星影 宇宙ノ介, Hoshikage Soranosuke) is a veteran defense attorney whose law office previously employed Mia Fey, Robert Hammond, and Diego Armando. He inadvertently ruined the reputation of the Fey clan after being bribed by Redd White into giving him information about Misty Fey's involvement in the DL-6 case. This incident left him open to being blackmailed by White for 15 years.

He was Mia Fey's co-counsel during her second trial, where she first met Phoenix Wright. Grossberg was later visited by Wright as he was investigating the murders of Fey and Hammond, giving him information in both cases.

Grossberg received a red suit for the events of Trials and Tribulations since his brown suit would have blended in with the courtroom too much with a non-backlit handheld such as a GBA.

==== Mike Meekins ====
Mike Meekins (原灰 ススム, Harabai Susumu) was an excitable police officer called as a witness for the trial of Lana Skye. He aspires to be like Dick Gumshoe one day.

By the time of Zak Gramarye's murder trial, various acts of incompetency led to his demotion to court bailiff. Phoenix Wright probed him for issues surrounding Gramarye's escape from the court, giving him a free ticket to Trucy's magic show for his troubles.

==== Klavier Gavin ====
Voiced by: Ryōji Yamamoto (AA4); Toshiyuki Kusuda (AA5)

Klavier Gavin (牙琉 響也, Garyū Kyōya) is a prosecutor and Kristoph Gavin's younger brother. He faced off against Apollo Justice in three separate trials, as well as Phoenix Wright in the case that got him disbarred. He later resurfaces at Themis Legal Academy to help Apollo and Athena investigate the murder of his mentor, Constance Courte.

Unlike most prosecutors in the series, Gavin is relatively kind and forthcoming, often playfully teasing Apollo rather than insulting him. He has a rockstar motif, often playing air-guitar in court, as well being the lead vocalist & guitarist for his own band, The Gavinners.

==== Simon Blackquill ====
Voiced by (English): Troy Baker
Voiced by (Japanese): Shunsuke Sakuya

Simon Blackquill (夕神 迅, Yūgami Jin) is a prosecutor who was allowed to continue his job seven years after being found guilty of murder. He often uses psychological manipulation as well as his pet hawk, Taka (ギン, Gin), to intimidate others in court.

In various cases, he faced off against Phoenix Wright, Apollo Justice, and Athena Cykes, who all later helped clear his name. Afterwards, he is seen assisting Cykes in the defense of his old friend, Bucky Whet.

The character's English name is a reference to the children's game Simon Says, a nod to his manipulative behavior in court.

==== Gregory Edgeworth ====
Portrayed by: Takehiro Hira (film)
Voiced by (English): Greggory Quaranta (AAI2); Anthony Bowling (anime)
Voiced by (Japanese): Ryūnosuke Watanuki

The late father of Miles Edgeworth, Gregory Edgeworth (御剣 信, Mitsurugi Shin) was a defense attorney who was killed in the DL-6 incident. Despite their differing occupations, he shared his son's stern nature and desire to arrive at the truth. He briefly appears as a playable character in Prosecutor's Gambit, which details the final case he investigated before his death. His physical appearance and English name are both homages to Gregory Peck's portrayal of Atticus Finch in the 1962 film adaptation of To Kill a Mockingbird.

==== Director Hotti ====
"Director Hotti" (堀田 ディレクター, Hotta Direkutā) also known as "Director Hickfield" (引田 ディレクター, Hikita Direkutā) is a patient of both the Hotti and Hickfield clinics, each time purporting to be the director of said clinic. He is notably perverted, showing a creepy interest in female patients he finds attractive.

==== Kay Faraday ====
Kay Faraday (一条 美雲, Ichijō Mikumo) is a young girl who is a self-proclaimed "Great Thief" who wishes to "steals the truth." She inherited the moniker of "Yatagarasu" from her late father, prosecutor Byrne Faraday (一条 九郎, Ichijō Kurō), who worked outside the law in an effort to deliver justice to those who could not be brought to court.

She has known Edgeworth and Gumshoe for a long time, having first met both around the time of a double murder case the former investigated. She later served as Edgeworth's unofficial assistant in both Investigations and its sequel, helping recreate crime scenes in vivid detail with her simulation device, "Little Thief."

==== Shi-Long Lang ====
Shi-Long Lang (狼 士龍, Rō Shiryū; Pinyin: Láng Shìlóng) is an Interpol agent with hundreds of subordinates, hailing from the Republic of Zheng Fa. He served as a rival to Miles Edgeworth in Investigations, and had a deep hatred for prosecutors and the court, spurned from a prosecutor ruining the reputation of his family.

==== Tyrell Badd ====
Tyrell Badd (馬堂 一徹, Badō Ittetsu) is a veteran homicide detective, previously charged with capturing the Yatagarasu. He was also put in charge of the case that led up to the DL-6 incident, assisting Manfred von Karma and later Gregory Edgeworth in their investigations.

In reality, Badd was actually one of three members of the Yatagarasu, co-creating the group with Byrne Faraday and Calisto Yew in order to take down a smuggling ring whose leader could seemingly not be convicted. Using his privilege as the detective in charge of their cases, Badd made sure no evidence of their involvement made it to the courts.

Badd later testified to his involvement with the Yatagarasu, as well as the subsequent trial resulting from Miles Edgeworth's resolution of his father's final case.

=== Phoenix Wright: Ace Attorney ===
==== April May ====
Voiced by (English): Jeannie Tirado
Voiced by (Japanese): Mariko Honda

April May (松竹 梅世, Shōchiku Umeyo) is the secretary of Redd White, as well as his accomplice. She was a witness in the trial of Maya Fey, who she attempted to incriminate as Mia Fey's killer. May stayed in Gatewater Hotel, where she listened in on a wiretap Fey's office prior to her murder, and later called the police to incriminate Maya.

She is noted for her sex appeal, using her cleavage and a flirtatious manner of speech to disarm those around her. However, this carefully crafted demeanor can fall apart when she is cornered.

==== Bellboy ====
The Bellboy (ボーイ, Bōi) was an unnamed bellboy who worked at Gatewater Hotel, located near Wright and Co. Law Offices. He testified to the existence of "a companion" in April May's room, making him one of the few unnamed witnesses in the series.

After his involvement in the trial, he advertised the room's existence as a crime scene in an apparently successful bid to promote the hotel. He was also known to deliver tea to Edgeworth's room, which led him to discover Edgeworth's "suicide note."

==== Redd White ====
Portrayed by: Makoto Ayukawa (film)
Voiced by (English): Larry Brantley
Voiced by (Japanese): Hiromichi Tezuka

The arrogant CEO of Bluecorp, Redd White (小中 大, Konaka Masaru) is a blackmailer who was the culprit in Wright's second trial and the killer of Mia Fey. He anonymously leaked details of Misty Fey's involvement in the DL-6 Incident, which he purchased from Marvin Grossberg, and subsequently used to blackmail him.

He is shown to be somewhat unintelligent, often misusing large words and giving incriminating details in his testimonies.

==== Sal Manella ====
Voiced by (English): Tyler Walker
Voiced by (Japanese): Masato Nishino

Sal Manella (宇在 拓也, Uzai Takuya) is a television director at Global Studios who was called as a witness to the murder of Jack Hammer. Manella directed the popular television series, The Steel Samurai: Warrior of Neo Olde Tokyo, which counted Maya Fey and Miles Edgeworth amongst its many fans.

He is shown to have a nerdy personality, peppering his phrases with leetspeak and drooling at women he found attractive. He was inspired by Fey's outfit to create another successful character, The Pink Princess.

==== Cody Hackins ====
Voiced by (English): Kara Edwards
Voiced by (Japanese): Shizuka Ishigami

Cody Hackins (大滝 九太, Ōtaki Kyūta) is a child who was a huge fan of the Steel Samurai series. He broke into Global Studios to see the character in person, which later resulted in him becoming a vital witness during the trial of Will Powers.

==== Jack Hammer ====
Voiced by (English): Phillip Annarella

Jack Hammer (衣袋 武志, Ibukuro Takeshi) was the murder victim in the trial of Will Powers. Hammer was once a successful film actor, now reduced to playing low-paying parts in television series.

His most recent role was the Evil Magistrate, whom he portrayed in Steel Samurai, opposite Powers. He was resentful of Powers and Dee Vasquez, attempting to murder the latter whilst incriminating the former.

==== Dee Vasquez ====
Portrayed by: Miho Ninagawa (film)
Voiced by (English): Janelle Lutz
Voiced by (Japanese): Yurika Hino

Dee Vasquez (姫神 サクラ, Himegami Sakura) is a powerful producer at Global Studios, who was called as a witness for the murder of Jack Hammer. After witnessing actor Manuel's fatal accident that incriminated Hammer, she blackmailed him into playing most of his recent roles.

Vasquez is also known for her ties to the mob, which she used against Phoenix Wright when he attempted to confront her.

==== Robert Hammond ====
Portrayed by: Eisuke Sasai (film)
Voiced by (English): Blake Shepard

Robert Hammond (生倉 雪夫, Namakura Yukio) was the murder victim in the trial of Miles Edgeworth. He was noted to be a highly competent defense attorney, however he had no trust in his clients and little regard for their wellbeing after the case ended.

==== Yanni Yogi ====
Portrayed by: Fumiyo Kohinata (film)
Voiced by (English): R. Bruce Elliott
Voiced by (Japanese): Takehiro Hasu

Yanni Yogi (灰根 高太郎, Haine Kōtarō) was a court bailiff involved in the DL-6 Incident. He was falsely believed to be the murderer of Gregory Edgeworth due to them being trapped in the same elevator. Robert Hammond managed to defend him by pleading insanity due to reduced oxygen in the elevator damaging his brain. Unfortunately this defense ruined his life, with his career and fiancée both gone.

He resurfaced, posing as a senile old man, in charge of a boat rental shop. He kept up the act in court, with Wright being forced to call his parrot Polly (サユリ, Sayuri) to testify to his true identity.

==== Bruce Goodman ====
Bruce Goodman (多田敷 道夫, Tadashiki Michio) was the murder victim in the trial of Lana Skye. Goodman was a police detective who was the head investigator of the SL-9 case. He later grew suspicious of the case's outcome after being approached by Jake Marshall, who asked him to re-open it.

==== Damon Gant ====
Damon Gant (巌徒 海慈, Ganto Kaiji) was the Chief of Police in Rise from the Ashes, an additional chapter of the first game added to later releases. Despite his affable persona, he was noted to be "tough on crime" abusing his power to create false evidence in order to achieve the desired outcome in a case.

==== Lana Skye ====
Lana Skye (宝月 巴, Hōzuki Tomoe) was the Chief Prosecutor who was accused of murdering detective Bruce Goodman. She is the older sister of Ema Skye, who called upon Phoenix Wright to prove her innocence. The three medals pinned to her chest are proof of her profession.

In the Japanese musical based on the series, Ace Attorney – The Truth Reborn, staged by the all-female troupe Takarazuka Revue, Asahi Miwa was cast as Leona Clyde (レオナ・クライド, Reona Kuraido), an original character based on Lana, whom Phoenix Wright is featured as having once been in a romantic relationship with in place of Iris/Dahlia Hawthorne. The sequel, Ace Attorney 2 – The Truth Reborn, Again..., establishes Leona to have died shortly after the first musical, and he mourns her death.

==== Jake Marshall ====
Jake Marshall (罪門 恭介, Zaimon Kyōsuke) is a patrol officer, who was formerly a police detective in the SL-9 case. He is the elder brother of Neil Marshall (罪門 直斗, Zaimon Naoto), a prosecutor who was in charge of the case before being its final victim. Marshall's suspicions of the case led him to request Goodman's help in re-opening the case.

He is obsessed with the Wild West, dressing and talking like a cowboy, as well making numerous references to Texas, despite being from Los Angeles.

Jake Marshall was written as a parallel to Godot in terms of the analogy between the Skye and Fey sisters.

Neil Marshall

Neil Marshall(罪門 直斗,Naoto Zaimon) was a prosecutor who worked on the SL-9 case. He confronted Joe Darke, before Neil was impaled on a replica Knight armor holding a sharp sword.

==== Angel Starr ====
Angel Starr (市ノ谷 響華, Ichinotani Kyōka) is a boxed lunch vendor, who was formerly a police detective reputed as the "Cough-Up Queen." She was a detective alongside Goodman and Marshall in the SL-9 case. Her firing led her to become hostile towards prosecutors, notably Lana Skye and Miles Edgeworth; both of whom she suspected of foul play.

Her lunches serve as a way to express her feelings toward people, typically offering less appealing ones towards those who earn her frustration. With colored contacts, her eye color would change from black to blue depending on her mood. She is apparently polyamorous, making use of multiple "boyfriends" to gather information.

=== Justice for All ===
==== Richard Wellington ====
Voiced by (English): Ricco Fajardo
Voiced by (Japanese): Daisuke Kishio

Richard Wellington (諸平野 貴雅, Moroheiya Takamasa) was a self-proclaimed "drifting virtuoso" who claimed to be looking for the right college. He was called as a witness of the murder of police officer Dustin Prince (町尾 守, Machio Mamoru).

Wellington was actually a con artist, whose phone revealed a number of contacts and messages from other con artists he was in league with. He successfully inflicted Wright with amnesia before the trial of Maggey Byrde, but was exposed for his crimes regardless.

==== Ini Miney ====
Voiced by (English): Mikaela Krantz
Voiced by (Japanese): Natsue Sasamoto

Ini Miney (葉中 のどか, Hanaka Nodoka) was a ditzy girl fascinated by the occult who studied parapsychology. She served as a witness to the murder of Turner Grey (霧崎 哲郎, Kirisaki Tetsurō), the director of a surgical clinic, who sought out Maya Fey to channel Ini's sister, Mimi Miney (葉中 未実, Hanaka Mimi), a nurse who worked under him before dying in a car accident. This channeling was for the purpose of testifying to a medical malpractice suit where several patients were mistreated. The public blamed Grey, but he identified Mimi, who he overworked, as the true culprit.

However, Mimi was still alive, and thus unable to be channeled. Ini was the one who perished in the accident, and Mimi subsequently assumed her identity. To simultaneously deal with Grey and avoid suspicion, Mimi worked with Morgan to concoct a plan that would kill Grey, and leave Maya to take the fall.

==== Max Galactica ====
Voiced by (English): Aaron Roberts
Voiced by (Japanese): Shinya Hamazoe

Billy Bob Johns (山田 耕平, Yamada Kōhei), better known under his stage name, Maximillion "Max" Galactica (マキシミリアン・ギャラクティカ, Makishimirian Gyarakutika) is a magician who is the most well-known performer at Berry Big Circus. He was accused of murdering the ringmaster, Russell Berry (立見 七百人, Tachimi Naoto).

He wished to elevate the ambition of his fellow performers at the circus, but he only came across as arrogant, making him largely unpopular with his peers.

==== Acro ====
Voiced by (English): Clifford Chapin
Voiced by (Japanese): Takayuki Nakatsukasa

Ken Dingling (木下 大作, Kinoshita Daisuke), known under the stage name Acro (アクロ, Akuro) was an acrobat, alongside his younger brother Sean Dingling (木下 一平, Kinoshita Ippei), who performed as Bat (バット, Batto) for the Berry Big Circus. The pair are currently inactive, with Acro being paralyzed and Bat comatose.

Despite his misfortune, Acro has an unusually calm and polite demeanor in contrast to most of his fellow performers. He is taken care of in part by Money (ルーサー, Rūsā) a monkey who enjoys stealing shiny objects.

==== Benjamin Woodman ====
Voiced by (English): Jeff Johnson
Voiced by (Japanese): Yutaka Furukawa

Benjamin Woodman (木住 勉, Kizumi Ben) alongside his dummy, Trilo Quist (リロ, Riro) is a performer for the Berry Big Circus, doing a ventriloquism act.

He is notably shy, often refusing to speak at length on his own. When speaking through Trilo however, he becomes incredibly brash, in a stark contrast to his own personality.

==== Regina Berry ====
Voiced by (English): Jad Saxton
Voiced by (Japanese): Yō Taichi

Regina Berry (立見 里香, Tachimi Rika) is Russell's daughter and an animal tamer for the Berry Big Circus. Due to being raised in the circus, she has a fantastical view of the world, which makes her unable to grasp the gravity of subjects like death.

==== Moe ====
Voiced by (English): Sonny Strait
Voiced by (Japanese): Takeshi Uchida

Lawrence Curls (富田 松夫, Tomida Matsuo), known under the stage name Moe (トミー, Tomī) is a clown who performed at Berry Big Circus. He was a longtime friend of Russel Berry, and took over as ringmaster after his death.

Despite his dedication to his craft, Moe was unable to get laughs from the audience due to his poor jokes. This carries over into his court appearances where Phoenix can end up penalized if he presses Moe when he tells a bad joke.

==== Matt Engarde ====
Portrayed by: Yuji Abe (film)
Voiced by (English): Dave Trosko
Voiced by (Japanese): Yasuaki Takumi

Matt Engarde (王都楼 真悟, Ōtarō Shingo) is a television actor and the rival of Juan Corrida (藤見野 イサオ, Fujimino Isao), he was the defendant in the final case of Justice for All. He was the star of The Nickel Samurai television series, which aired at the same time on a separate network as Corrida's show The Jammin' Ninja.

Engarde is perceived as unintelligent and overly reliant, often requesting to consult someone else when asked a remotely difficult question. However, there is a different side to him that he keeps hidden, a fact indicated by his names in both Japanese and English, to a lesser extent.

=== Trials and Tribulations ===
==== Godot ====
Voiced by (English): James C. Wilson (AA3); Brandon Potter (anime)
Voiced by (Japanese): Hideki Kamiya (AA3); Hiroaki Hirata (anime)

Godot (ゴドー, Godō), real name Diego Armando (神乃木 荘龍, Kaminogi Sōryū) is a mysterious prosecutor with a grudge against Wright, actively seeking to prosecute every trial of his in Trials and Tribulations. He was previously a defense attorney working under Grossberg, serving as Mia Fey's co-counsel for her very first trial.

The pair's relationship later turned romantic, unfortunately, it was-short lived as a rare poison made Armando comatose until well after Fey's death. He was awakened by the scent of coffee, which subsequently became his favorite drink. He sports a visor which allows him to see, with the noted exception of being unable to register the color red on a white background.

==== Ron DeLite ====
Voiced by (English): Justin Pate
Voiced by (Japanese): Kōtarō Nishiyama

Ron DeLite (天杉 優作, Amasugi Yūsaku) was a security guard who later adopted the identity of Mask☆DeMasque (怪人☆仮面マスク, Kaijin☆Kamen Masuku), a professional thief with a flamboyant costume. He is noted for his nervous demeanor, often adding a "PLEEEEEEAASSSE!" onto his sentences when agitated.

Phoenix Wright defended him after he was accused of stealing the Kurain Village's sacred urn, and once again after he was accused of murdering his former boss, Kane Bullard (毒島 黒兵衛, Busujima Kurobē).

==== Desirée DeLite ====
Voiced by (English): Jamie Marchi
Voiced by (Japanese): Yuka Keichō

Desirée DeLite (天杉 希華, Amasugi Mareka) is Ron's beloved wife, who loves to shop. Unfortunately, her spending habits could not be supported by Ron's income, leading him to resort to theft. However, his wife's hatred of criminals made it difficult for him to come clean about his work.

However, after finding out the truth she later worked alongside Ron. The pair had a business rehabilitating thieves, but also gave them plans to commit theft.

==== Dahlia Hawthorne ====
Voiced by (English): Dani Chambers
Voiced by (Japanese): Rina Satō

Dahlia Hawthorne (美柳 ちなみ, Miyanagi Chinami) was a college student who was romantically involved with Phoenix Wright during his time studying at Ivy University. She was a witness to three separate murders in Trials and Tribulations namely those of her ex-boyfriend, Doug Swallow (呑田 菊三, Nonda Kikuzō), her sister, Valerie Hawthorne (美柳 勇希, Miyanagi Yūki), and Misty Fey. She was noted for her charming demeanor, which quickly turned sinister whenever pressed into a corner. The majority of the crimes she committed were done either to prevent her from being incriminated in a previous crime, or to get revenge on Mia Fey, who proved her guilt in court.

She was created by Shu Takumi and designed by Tatsurō Iwamoto, who had trouble designing her despite Trials and Tribulations being an easier design process for him overall due to Dahlia conveying both "heroine" and "ultimate villain" to him, as well as her use of both western and traditional Japanese clothing. He was able to create designs that fulfill each of these elements, but struggled to combine them into one, requiring Capcom to give him a separate room to focus on design. He estimated it took around 2–3 months to find a design, though he did take a break at one point due to a lack of progress. Her English name was created by English localizer Janet Hsu, and comes the album Dahlia by the Japanese rock band X Japan. Hsu exclaimed that they were listening to the album at the time, and liked the name Dahlia. They stated that her surname, Hawthorne, was a reference to the short story "Rappaccini's Daughter", and that her nickname, "Dollie," comes from her "Dolly" name from the fan translation of Trials and Tribulations.

Dani Chambers, her English voice actor, expressed excitement to play the role due to her love of the Ace Attorney series and being able to play a mean character in her vocal register, as she had usually been cast as young girl characters due to her register being very high. In Japanese, Dahlia speaks in an honorific language.

Dahlia Hawthorne has been generally well received as a villain, considered among the most evil in Ace Attorney. NintendoLife writer Kate Gray praised Dahlia as a "compelling" villain whom she enjoyed facing in court, compared her to Professor Moriarty, the rival of Sherlock Holmes, someone who is a "real foil that's almost as good at hiding her tracks as [Phoenix] is at revealing them." She found her a highlight of the series, arguing that even once she is defeated, it doesn't change the trauma suffered by characters like Iris, Godot, Phoenix, and the Fey family, as well as the deaths of Terry and Valerie. She nevertheless considered her the most tragic character in the series, citing her mother abandoning her due to a lack of love and her father resenting her due to her mother's lack of power. She considered her among the best villains in video games. Hardcore Gamine 101 staff argued that Trials and Tribulations was often considered the best title in the Phoenix Wright series, attributing this in part to Dahlia being "one of the most devious villains" in Ace Attorney.

==== Luke Atmey ====
Voiced by (English): Ian Sinclair
Voiced by (Japanese): Toshihiko Seki

Luke Atmey (星威岳 哀牙, Hoshīdake Aiga) is a self proclaimed "Ace Detective" who heads the Atmey detective agency and who styled himself as the arch-enemy of the thief, Mask☆DeMasque. In actuality, Atmey was a blackmailer, who bribed the thief into stealing various artifacts for him. However, Kane Bullard caught wind of Atmey's involvement in the thefts and ended up blackmailing him in turn.

As his name implies, Atmey is very egocentric, often showing off his impressive vocabulary and using alliterations with complex words. His agency is accordingly adorned with items such as a large self-portrait and an unabridged autobiography.

==== Jean Armstrong ====
Voiced by (English): J. Michael Tatum
Voiced by (Japanese): Fukushi Ochiai

Jean Armstrong (本土坊 薫, Hondobō Kaoru) is a faux-french effeminate chef and proprietor of the Trés Bien restaurant. His restaurant's pricing along with the low quality taste of the food let to it falling on hard times. This led him to take out a loan from Furio Tigre, forcing him to do as the loan shark said.

He was a witness in the one trial of Maggey Byrde, who worked as a waitress for him before the case. He was also a bit of a kleptomaniac, having stolen Wright's magatama.

==== Victor Kudo ====
Voiced by (English): Greg Dulcie
Voiced by (Japanese): Jin Urayama

Victor Kudo (五十嵐 将兵, Igarashi Shōhei) is an agitated old man who is skilled in kimono embroidery. Unfortunately due to living in an area where there is less demand for kimonos, he feels largely useless, often trying and failing to find work. He was a regular at Trés Bien, which led to him being called as a witness for one of Byrde's trials.

==== Furio Tigre ====
Voiced by (English): Sam Riegel
Voiced by (Japanese): Satoshi Mikami

Furio Tigre (芝九蔵 虎ノ助, Shibakuzo Toranosuke) is a loan shark who operates the Tender Lender. He has a loud and aggressive demeanor, often roaring when agitated. Per his work, he preyed on people in need of money like Jean Armstrong; who needed the loan to save his restaurant and the recently deceased programmer, Glen Elg (岡 高夫, Oka Takao); who needed to pay off his gambling debts.

He has a similar hairstyle to Phoenix, despite not resembling him at all otherwise in terms of appearance or personality, he was able to successfully impersonate him to throw a previous trial of Byrde's. His portrayal in the anime by Sam Riegel, the typical voice actor for Phoenix Wright, is considered a casting gag in reference to this fact.

==== Lisa Basil ====
She is the head of Blue Screens, Inc. She has a mostly-blue color scheme with a monocular display on her left eye like her employees. She has a palindromic name and employs people who share this trait. After Glen Elg was murdered, she replaced him with Adam Mada, whose picture can be seen in one of the ending cutscenes.

==== Viola Cadaverini ====
Voiced by (English): Madeleine Morris
Voiced by (Japanese): Saori Hayami

Viola Cadaverini (鹿羽 うらみ, Shikabane Urami) is the granddaughter of an untouchable crime lord. She was an assistant to Furio Tigre, with a casual yet threatening demeanor that made her effective at collecting loans.

She suffered an injury at Tigre's hand, which led to him needing to pay off a massive loan for her medical treatment. However, she believed for a time that he genuinely cared for her.

==== Terry Fawles ====
Voiced by (English): Kyle Hebert
Voiced by (Japanese): Kenichirou Matsuda

Terry Fawles (尾並田 美散, Onamida Michiru) was a previous boyfriend and tutor of Dahlia Hawthorne and was accused of murdering her sister, Valerie. He was Mia Fey's first ever client, who took his case when no other lawyer was willing to.

He was involved in a conspiracy with the Hawthorne sisters to steal a diamond from their father and split the profits. However, he was betrayed and ended up being put on death row.

==== Iris ====
Voiced by (English): Dani Chambers
Voiced by (Japanese): Rina Satō

Iris (あやめ, Ayame) is a shrine maiden at the Hazakura Temple under the tutelage of the head nun, Bikini (毘忌尼). She bears a strange resemblance to Dahlia. She is a kind young woman who is Wright's final client in Trials and Tribulations.

Bikini is as short as she is due to memory limitations.

=== Apollo Justice: Ace Attorney ===
==== Kristoph Gavin ====
Voiced by (English): Andrew Alfonso
Voiced by (Japanese): Ryōji Yamamoto

Kristoph Gavin (牙琉 霧人, Garyū Kirihito) is a defense attorney who previously employed Apollo Justice. He is known for his calm demeanor, noted to be "the Coolest Defense in the West." He served as Justice's co-counsel for Phoenix Wright's trial, where he was accused of murdering traveler, Shadi Smith (浦伏 影郎, Urafushi Kagerō). However, he was quickly put on the witness stand when Wright accused Gavin of committing the murder himself, leading to his incarceration.

He also poisoned Vera Misham (絵瀬 まこと, Ese Makoto) by putting atroquinine, a very potent poison into nail polish that was given to her as a "good luck charm". Whenever she bit her nails with the nail polish on, she became poisoned, then was sent to a hospital and miraculously survived due to the dosage of poison being under the lethal dose.

He was called as a witness once again for the trial of Vera Misham, after being visited by Phoenix in his prison cell.

==== Alita Tiala ====
Alita Tiala (並奈 美波, Namina Minami) was the fiancée of Wocky Kitaki (北木 滝太, Kitaki Takita), son of Plum Kitaki and Winfred "Big Wins" Kitaki, and the heir of the Kitaki crime family. She enlisted Apollo to defend Wocky in court, during a seemingly unrelated array of incidents he was charged by Phoenix to investigate.

Apollo eventually discovers her former occupation as nurse under Pal Meraktis (宇狩 輝夫, Ukari Teruo), the doctor Wocky is accused of killing. Tiala and Meraktis discovered a nearly fatal bullet in Wocky's chest that would kill him with much more movement. Apollo exposes the truth in court, enraging Tiala, who was certain he would fail to defend Wocky.

==== Daryan Crescend ====
Daryan Crescend (眉月 大庵, Mayuzuki Daian) was a police detective and bandmate of Klavier Gavin, being the Gavinners' second guitarist. He has a shark motif and a gigantic pompadour only fully shown in profile.

He tries to be calm and collected, but can be rustled easily once called into suspicion. He was called in as a witness to the murder of Romein LeTouse (ローメイン・レタス, Rōmein Retasu), Lamiroir's bodyguard, who was revealed to be an undercover agent.

==== Vera Misham ====
Vera Misham (絵瀬 まこと, Ese Makoto) is the daughter of art forger, Drew Misham (絵瀬 土武六, Ese Doburoku). She is a monotone young woman who uses pictures to convey her emotions rather than expressions.

As it turns out, she was the actual forger, financially supporting her father with her skill at faking previously created works being rather profitable. Having been sheltered most of her life, she is prone nerves, often biting her nails in situations where she is made especially uncomfortable.

Wright requests that Justice defend her after she is accused of poisoning her father. Her trial is utilized to test the jurist system, an experiment which lets members of the public decide verdicts.

==== Magnifi Gramarye ====
Magnifi Gramarye (或真敷 天斎, Arumajiki Tensai) was a magician of great renown. He is the father of Thalassa and the grandfather of Trucy and Apollo. He had the ability to perceive, using tells to determine the dishonesty of a person's claims, a skill inherited by his descendants. In his youth, he was an incredible magician, with the ownership of tricks his successors clamored over the rights for.

Near the end of his, he put his two prospective successors, Zak and Valant through a test. Each man was given a gun with a single bullet, if they shot correctly, they stood to inherit his tricks. Zak shot a clown doll, not being able to kill his former master, successfully gaining the rights. Satisfied with the result, Magnifi committed suicide, shooting himself in the head. However, his death later led to the two magicians falling under suspicion of murdering him.

==== Thalassa Gramarye ====
Thalassa Gramarye (或真敷 優海, Arumajiki Yūmi) is the daughter of Magnifi as well as Apollo and Trucy's mother, who was once a member of Troupe Gramarye. Her career was cut short by a presumed fatal incident where Zak and Valant shot at her whilst she was to avoid getting hit. Magnifi used her death to blackmail his disciples.

In actuality, she survived, albeit without her vision. Resurfacing in Borginia as the songstress Lamiroir (ラミロア, Ramiroa), she gained acclaim for her talents and later collaborated with Klavier Gavin in concert. She crossed paths with her children when they were to defend her pianist, Machi Tobaye (マキ・トバーユ, Maki Tobāyu), in court. She was also one of the jurors in Vera Misham's trial.

Later, she regained her vision with laser surgery, and her memory returned as well. She has since met privately with Wright to discuss her children, as well as when to reveal her identity as their long-lost-mother.

==== Zak Gramarye ====
Zak Gramarye (或真敷 ザック, Arumajiki Zakku) real name Shadi Enigmar (奈々伏 影郎, Nanafushi Kagerō) was a magician who performed with Troupe Gramarye. He was Thalassa's second husband and Trucy Wright's biological father. He once chose Phoenix Wright to be his defense attorney after he beat him in a poker game.

However, the outcome of the subsequent trial led to him fleeing the country. He resurfaced years later to tie up various loose ends, but he ended up being killed before he could disappear again. His alias during this time was "Shadi Smith." He is referred to as such during the first case in Apollo Justice.

==== Valant Gramarye ====
Valant Gramarye (或真敷 バラン, Arumajiki Baran) is a magician who performed alongside Zak and Thalassa with Troupe Gramarye. He feels somewhat inadequate, with Zak being picked over him in most junctures and viewing his own tricks as inferior.

After discovering Zak falsely confessed to Magnifi's murder to protect him, he told Phoenix the truth; Magnifi killed himself and Valant altered the crime scene to incriminate Zak. He subsequently decided to turn himself in.

==== Spark Brushel ====
Spark Brushel (葉見垣 正太郎, Hamigaki Shōtarō) is a freelance journalist and licensed notary who had ties to Zak Gramarye. Brushel is known to be on the lookout for the next scoop, leading him to pursue elusive figures like Troupe Gramarye and Drew Misham.

He is called as a witness to the trial of Vera Misham, and later assists Phoenix Wright by giving him knowledge about Thalassa and the Gramarye clan.

=== Dual Destinies ===
==== Gaspen Payne ====
Voiced by: Hisashi Izumi

Gaspen Payne (亜内 文武, Auchi Fumitake) is Winston Payne's younger brother who appears as the first prosecutor in Phoenix Wright: Ace Attorney – Dual Destinies. He is a bit more flexible with the law than his brother and is not averse to using dirty tricks in the courtroom; his attitude is rather conceited towards defense attorneys as well. He wears a black suit with sunglasses and has a large quiff hairdo that is actually a wig.

He reappears in Spirit of Justice as the Chief Prosecutor of Khura'in, achieved due to the country's lack of lawyers. Believing Wright would surrender or die once learning of the Defense Culpability Act, he ends up utterly shocked once Wright successfully defends Ahlbi.

==== Juniper Woods ====
Voiced by: Eri Ōzeki

Juniper Woods (森澄 しのぶ, Morizumi Shinobu) is Athena's best friend from childhood, studying to become a judge at Themis Legal Academy. She tries to present a confident exterior, but it falters at times when she is under stress. She also has a crush on Apollo, who helped defend her in her first trial and later rescued her when a courtroom she was in exploded.

She is accused of murdering Constance Courte (道葉 正世, Michiba Masayo), due to the crime scene being identical to one in a mock trial that she wrote. Athena exonerates her in court, in a rare trial with her heading the defense. She is once again falsely accused of murdering detective Candice Arme (賀来 ほずみ, Kaku Hozumi), with Wright and Cykes coming to her defense.

==== Bobby Fulbright ====
Voiced by: Biichi Satō

Bobby Fulbright (番 轟三, Ban Gōzō) is a police detective who heads the investigations in Dual Destinies. His catchphrase is "In Justice We Trust!" and a lot of his mentality seems to similarly revolve around his perception of justice. Despite being relatively competent at his job, he is shown to be absentminded at times, with a thief swiping the shoes he wore without him noticing. Even though he knows he is aligned with the prosecution, he will feed information to the defense if he believes them more just.

The actual Fulbright is never seen, having been murdered roughly a year ago by an international spy who replicated his identity. However, said spy's efforts at duplicating imply his personality was roughly the same.

==== Ted Tonate ====
Ted Tonate (馬等島 晋吾, Barashima Shingo) is a member of the police bomb disposal squad. He prefers to communicate through synthesized speech, dictating his words through a keyboard mounted on his arm.

He was skilled at both building and deconstructing bombs. He used these skills to sell the bombs he defused on the black market, replacing them with homemade models.

==== Florent L'Belle ====
Florent L'Belle (美葉院 秀一, Biyōin Shūichi) was an aide to mayor Damian Tenma (天馬 出右衛門, Tenma Dēmon), father to Jinxie Tenma. He murdered the alderman of Nine-Tails Vale, Rex Kyubi (九尾 銀次, Kyūbi Ginji), and let Tenma take the fall. L'Belle is an extremely narcissistic man, who created and advertised his own line of beauty products, without actually selling them.

This put him into debt, motivating him to anonymously threaten Tenma into merging Tenma Town with Nine-Tails Vale, as he was made aware of the presence of a gold ingot in the alderman's room. However, Justice and, his new investigative partner, Cykes uncovered his scheme, leading him to publicly admit his guilt in a laughing fit.

Elements of his design and flamboyant persona are thought to be inspired by the Joker and Oscar Wilde.

==== Aristotle Means ====
Aristotle Means (一路 真二, Ichiro Shinji) was a teacher at Themis Legal Academy, who taught the defense attorney course. His philosophy of "the end justifies the means" was widely taught to students in the dark age of the law, where lawyers and prosecutors alike would do anything to gain the advantage in court.

The divisiveness of this belief drew a wedge between Juniper Woods and her friends, with prosecutor-in-training Robin Newman (厚井 知潮, Atsui Chishio) mutually respecting it with a belief of fair play, whilst lawyer-in-training Hugh O'Conner (静矢 零, Shizuya Rei) adhered exclusively to it for a time.

==== Aura Blackquill ====
Aura Blackquill (夕神 かぐや, Yūgami Kaguya) is the elder sister of Simon Blackquill who was a robotics engineer at the Cosmos Space Center. She strongly believed in the innocence of her brother, and grew to hate the legal system that convicted him.

The day before Simon was to be executed, Aura took over the space center, taking hostages and threatening their lives if a retrial for Simon was not performed. While her desired outcome was achieved, she ended up being arrested. The younger Blackquill later visited the Wright Anything Agency to see if they would represent her in court.

==== Marlon Rimes ====
Marlon Rimes (伊塚 育也, Itsuka Ikuya) is an aquarist at the Shipshape Aquarium who has a penchant for rapping, as his name implies. He is called as a witness to the trial of Orla (エール, Ēru), an orca who was accused of murdering the aquarium's former owner, Jack Shipley (荒船 良治, Arafune Ryōji). Orla has an older sister named Ora Shipley.

=== Spirit of Justice ===
==== Ahlbi Ur'gaid ====
Voiced by: Emiri Katō

Ahlbi Ur'gaid (ボクト・ツアーニ, Bokuto Tsuāni) is a monk-in-training living in Khura'in, a village from which the Fey clan originates. He is also a tour guide, giving aid to Phoenix Wright in learning the area. He owns a dog named Shah'do (ミタマル, Mitamaru), who tends to jump out of his bag.

Khura'in's hatred of lawyers is initially hardwired into him, even when he is accused of murder and threatened with the death penalty. However, he begins to question this aspect of his country after being saved by Phoenix. At the age of 9, he is one of the youngest defendants in the series.

==== Nahyuta Sahdmadhi ====
Voiced by: Daisuke Namikawa

Nahyuta Sahdmadhi (ナユタ・サードマディ, Nayuta Sādomadi) is a highly-skilled prosecutor from Khura'in. His background as a monk earns him the title of the "Last Rites Prosecutor." His reputation allowed him even to prosecute trials in America, where he studied up on the country and potentially relevant information for each trial he was assigned to prosecute.

He is quite insulting, often making use of Khura'inese metaphors and throwing constricting beads to accentuate his points. He was previously a fledgling revolutionary, who wished to fix the law from inside but time seems to have turned him into a full-on adherent of his country's current legal system.

==== Rayfa Padma Khura'in ====
Voiced by: Saori Hayami

Rayfa Padma Khura'in (レイファ・パドマ・クライン, Reifa Padoma Kurain) is the princess of Khura'in who uses the Divination Séance to review a murder victim's final moments of life. This along with the prosecution is believed to be enough to correctly deduce the culprit of any given trial.

However, Phoenix later points out errors in her interpretations, in a manner similar to a cross-examination, earning her ire for a time. She accompanies Wright during his investigation of the murder of Tahrust Inmee, wishing to keep an eye on him.

She is secretly Nahyuta's sister and the daughter of the rebel Dhurke. Khura'in's belief that the sins of the father are passed onto his offspring makes this a potentially compromising detail Ga'ran uses to blackmail Nahyuta into service.

==== Inga Karkhuul Khura'in ====
Inga Karkhuul Khura'in (インガ・カルクール・クライン, Inga Karukūru Kurain), full name Inga Karkhuul Haw'kohd Dis'nahm Bi'ahni Lawga Ormo Pohmpus Da'nit Ar'edi Iz Khura'in III (インガ・カルクール・ククルーラ・ラルバン・ギジール・ホフダラン・マダラ・ヴィラ・ヤシマ・ジャクティエール・クライン3世, Inga Karukūru Kukurūra Raruban Gijīru Hofudaran Madara Vira Yashima Jakutiēru Kurain San-sei) was the husband of Ga'ran, and the Minister of Justice in Khura'in.

He kept a stamp in his mouth in order to rapidly authorize execution requests, which piled up due to his wife's introduction of the defense culpability act. He was a power-hungry man but also showed some level of cowardice, at points even being bossed around by Maya Fey. Despite his heinous behavior, there was one person he truly cared for, his adoptive daughter Rayfa.

==== Dhurke Sahdmadhi ====
Voiced by: Masashi Ebara

Dhurke Sahdmadhi (ドゥルク・サードマディ, Duruku Sādomadi) is the leader of the Defiant Dragons, a rebel group that wishes to remove Ga'ran from power. He is the father of Nahyuta and Rayfa and the foster father of Apollo, having raised him alongside Nahyuta during the early years of his life. He was formerly a skilled defense attorney, becoming a rebel in part due to the defense culpability act effectively turning his former job into a death sentence.

He was accused of murdering his wife Amara, who was formerly the queen of Khura'in which lead to him becoming a maligned figure in the country. Years later, Apollo was able to clear his name. Leading to Nahyuta regaining faith in the revolution, and seeing its goals achieved.

==== Datz Are'bal ====
Datz Are'bal (ダッツ・ディニゲル, Dattsu Dinigeru) is Dhurke's jovial right-hand man. Whilst he is dedicated to the cause, his nature makes it hard for him take to certain subjects seriously, often bursting into laughter when he finds something remotely funny. After being jailed in a rebel prison atop a mountain, he escaped by parachuting, giving him amnesia during a trial he was called to testify in.

He is often seen alongside Dhurke or other rebels, advancing the cause by way of hijacking government propaganda, protesting, and trying to avoid arrest.

He is considered analogous to Larry Butz, a similarly goofy character whose actions end up being important to the outcome of multiple trials.

==== Ga'ran Sigatar Khura'in ====
Voiced by: Gara Takashima

Ga'ran Sigatar Khura'in (ガラン・シガタール・クライン, Garan Shigatāru Kurain) is the queen of Khura'in. She wrote the Defense Culpability Act (DC Act) into law, giving lawyers the same punishments as their defendants, if they are found guilty of a crime.

She was formerly a prosecutor before becoming the Minister of Justice, and later ascending to queen after her sister. She has a somewhat calm exterior, but can quickly become quite cruel and condescending if pushed.

==== Jove Justice ====
Jove Justice (王泥喜 奏介, Odoroki Sōsuke) is the birth father of Apollo and Thalassa's first husband. He was a traveling musician who went by the name of 'Jangly Justice.' He met Thalassa during his time as a guest performer with Troupe Gramarye, which she later left to marry him.

He was killed in a fire at Khura'in, but lack of knowledge regarding his name made a seánce impossible for some time, before Dhurke discovered it, along with a photograph of him. His son Apollo made use of the eventual séance to determine his father's true killer.

==== Amara Sigatar Khura'in ====
Amara Sigatar Khura'in (アマラ・シガタール・クライン, Amara Shigatāru Kurain) was the ruler of Khura'in before Ga'ran and Dhurke's former wife. She is the mother of Nahyuta and Rayfa. Her death was a critical moment for the country, becoming justification for the DC Act, and smearing Dhurke as a villain.

In actuality, she survived, living primarily as Rayfa's servant Nayna (バアヤ, Baaya), heavily in disguise. Despite believing for a long time that Dhurke wished to kill her, the pair never stopped loving each other.

==== Pees'lubn Andistan'dhin ====
Pees'lubn Andistan'dhin (ポットディーノ・ニカワス, Pottodīno Nikawasu) was the head monk of Khura'in's Tehm'pul Temple. He is an illegal immigrant to Khura'in and converted to Khura'inism a year ago, despite never learning to read the scripture's language. His duties included performing musical accompaniment to Rayfa's Dance of Devotion on an instrument called a "dahmalan."

He was called as a witness to the murder of security guard, Paht Rohl (ミーマ・ワルヒト, Mīma Waruhito). He testified by singing whilst playing his dahmalan.

==== Roger Retinz ====
Roger Retinz (志乃山 金成, Shinoyama Kanenari) was an acclaimed television producer with a variety of well-known programs under his belt for Take-2 TV. His status earned him the alias "Ratings Rajah" (ジャック・ヤマシノ, Jakku Yamashino) and allowed him to produce Trucy's television debut, Trucy in Gramarye Land. He used this opportunity in an attempt to humiliate Trucy, with the aid of multiple performers.

Retinz was previously "Mr. Reus" (Mr. メンヨー, Misutā Menyō), a former member of Troupe Gramarye who was kicked out by Magnifi. Despite a majority of the Troupe being either retired or deceased, Retinz wishes to surpass them by taking on their legacy, Trucy Wright. He managed to use his experience as both a producer and magician to manipulate the trial at times. Be it his usage of tricks to prevent himself from being implicated, paying hecklers to attend trials, and even briefly managing to get the Wright Anything Agency signed over to him.

==== Tahrust Inmee ====
Tahrust Inmee (マルメル・アータム, Marumeru Ātamu) was a Khura'inese monk who was suspected of rebel involvement prior to his death. He and his wife, Beh'leeb Inmee (サーラ・アータム, Sāra Ātamu), looked after Maya during her time training in Khura'in. Maya was accused of murdering him, and channeled his spirit to testify.

==== Geiru Toneido ====
Geiru Toneido (旋風亭 風子, Senpūtei Pūko) was a rakugo performer acquainted with Simon Blackquill. She made use of balloons, creating various balloon objects, such as a hat, cake, a dog, and even padding her breasts with somewhat larger balloons. She was a witness in the trial of Bucky Whet (内舘 すする, Uchitate Susuru), who was accused of killing her master, Taifu Toneido (旋風亭 獏風, Senpūtei Bakufū).

Geiru has been the subject of internet notoriety, via the "clussy" (Clown + Pussy) meme. This extended her popularity beyond the Ace Attorney fandom, and spawned much graphic art produced, many by non-Ace Attorney players, with a heavy focus on Geiru's chest and "balloons". Her popularity has been attributed to her sex appeal and conventional attractiveness, comparatively to that of a typical "e-girl". She is often referred to by those outside of Ace Attorney specific fandom as the "Ace Attorney Clown Girl" or the "Clussy Girl".

==== Uendo Toneido ====
Uendo Toneido (旋風亭 美風, Senpūtei Bifū) is a rakugo performer with dissociative identity disorder. Alongside Uendo, their other alters include Patches (一八, Ippachi), an excitable taikomochi, Kisegawa (喜瀬川), a stern oiran, and Owen (磯田 定吉, Isoda Sadakichi), a shy five-year-old boy.

==== Paul Atishon ====
Paul Atishon-Whimperson (清木 まさはる, Kiyoki Masaharu) was a politician running for Local Assemblyman of Kurain Village. He is generally hated by the village who views him poorly in contrast to his celebrated grandfather, a former congressman named Abraham Atishon (清木 徳次郎, Kiyoki Tokujirō).

His is one of the few civil trials in the series, where he blackmails Phoenix into serving as his attorney against Apollo to determine of the ownership of a Khura'inese artifact known as the Founder's Orb.

==== Pierce Nichody ====
Pierce Nichody (十文字 一治, Jūmonji Kazuharu) was the butler for the Sprocket Family, and the director for the repair department of their company, Sprocket Aviation. He was called to testify concerning the murder of the family's head servant, Dumas Gloomsbury (米倉 静次, Yonekura Seiji).

=== Ace Attorney Investigations series ===
==== Calisto Yew ====
Voiced by (English): Kaori Funakoshi
Voiced by (Japanese): Yuki Nakamura

Calisto Yew (葛 氷見子, Kazura Himiko) also known as Shih-na (シーナ, Shīna), is an anonymous spy working for the Cohdopian smuggling ring. She is a master of disguise, appearing under a pair of separate identities at various points during Investigations. As Calisto, she was a defense attorney who grieved over her sister's death. She was ordered to join the Yatagarasu as a mole, ensuring they never actually took down the smuggling ring. Nonetheless, she used her skills as a defense attorney to identify the target of each planned heist, which she learned as companies came to her with the job. However, her ruse ended when Edgeworth identified her as the murderer of prosecutor Byrne Faraday and defendant Mack Rell (真刈 透, Makari Tōru).

As Shih-na, she was an Interpol agent who was a secretary to Shi-Long Lang, with a similar goal to keep him in the dark as to the identity of the smuggling ring's true leader. She often posed in tandem with him, and was rather silent in this persona. She was once again identified by Edgeworth in another double murder case, and subsequently gave him a crucial hint to the true killer's identity.

It is unclear what parts of her personality in either identity were a ruse, but each time she broke down laughing at Edgeworth's haughtiness.

==== Quercus Alba ====
Quercus Alba (カーネイジ・オンレッド, Kāneiji Onreddo; Carnage Onred) was the ambassador of Allebahst, one half of the divided Cohdopia. He was a decorated war hero who appeared to be a rather feeble elderly man who often blamed himself for things that went wrong.

However, he was actually the head of the Cohdopian smuggling ring. He used his position as an ambassador to his advantage, with the respect he earned in his home country preventing him from being tried there, and his diplomatic immunity rendering it impossible to try him abroad. However, with assistance from a number of his associates, Edgeworth was able to not only identify him as a murderer, but get him tried internationally as well.

==== Di-Jun Wang ====
Di-Jun Wang (王 帝君, Ō Teikun; Pinyin: Wáng Dìjūn) was the president of Zheng Fa. He was previously guarded by Shi-Long Lang's father, Da-Long Lang (狼 大龍, Rō Dairyū; Pinyin: Láng Dàlóng), before cutting ties with the family after being kidnapped.

He appeared in Prosecutor's Gambit, after surviving an attempt on his life, but was left in a frightened state. Contrary to his reputation as a respectable and honorable man, he was shown to be a bit of a duplicitous coward who staged the attempt to regain popularity in his home country.

Near the end of the game it was discovered the Di-Jun Wang that Edgeworth met was actually a body double impersonating the real president, and was also complicit in his counterpart's death 12 years prior.

==== Eddie Fender ====
Voiced by (Japanese): Keiji Fujiwara

Eddie Fender (信楽 盾之, Shigaraki Tateyuki) is a defense attorney who owns Gregory's old firm, Edgeworth Law Offices. He was previously an assistant to Gregory Edgeworth, aiding him in the final case that ended up claiming his life.

For a time, he grew to dislike Miles Edgeworth, believing his career as a prosecutor under Von Karma was an insult to his father's work. However, after reuniting and resolving several cases alongside the younger Edgeworth, including his father's last, he began to truly respect the prosecutor.

Unlike other notable defense attorneys, Fender is willing to defend those he knows are guilty of committing crimes, often empathizing with them, and hoping to reduce their sentences.

==== Bodhidharma Kanis ====
Bodhidharma Kanis (鳳院坊 了賢, Hōinbō Ryōken) is a blind assassin who was prosecuted by Edgeworth before being sent to prison. He is never far from his dog, Helmut (黒, Kuro), who serves as both a guide dog and an accomplice in his assassinations.

Even while imprisoned, he remained an intimidating figure. He blackmailed the prison warden, Fifi Laguarde (美和 マリー, Miwa Marī), into providing him and his fellow prisoners with various goods from outside the prison, as well as a large cell for himself. He also knows the fellow assassin.

==== Verity Gavèlle ====
Voiced by (Japanese): Eri Nakamura

Verity Gavèlle (水鏡 秤, Mikagami Hakari) is a judge who sought to disbar Edgeworth. She serves as his primary rival in Prosecutor's Gambit.

She viewed emotions as a weakness unbecoming of a judge, believing they affected her impartiality. However, she was not heartless. She became a loving adoptive mother to Shaun Fenn (相沢 詩紋, Aizawa Shimon), and later learned to view this connection as a source of strength.

==== Eustace Winner ====
Voiced by (English): Endigo
Voiced by (Japanese): Kotaro Ogiwara

Eustace Winner (一柳 弓彦, Ichiyanagi Yumihiko) is a dim-witted prosecutor who was ordered by Gavèlle to replace Edgeworth in a handful of cases. He believed himself to be an incredibly intelligent and talented prosecutor. Despite his ineptitude, he earned a variety of accolades and graduated top of the class during his time as a law student.

However, these awards were all in part due to his father, Excelsius using his power to manipulate outcomes. After learning the truth about himself, Eustace was disillusioned for a time, but Edgeworth managed to encourage him to become a different prosecutor from his father, and aid in his conviction.

==== Excelsius Winner ====
Voiced by (English): Jonathan Sherr

Excelsius Winner (一柳 万才, Ichiyanagi Bansai) was the chairman of the Committee for Prosecutorial Excellence and previously the Chief Prosecutor. He was a man unafraid to exploit his power to obtain the preferred outcome. He often "disappeared" anyone who stood against him, including his own wife, and disposed of evidence that ran contrary to his claims.

His abuse of power had long-reaching consequences, including setting the events of the DL-6 incident into motion. Despite his longstanding corruption, Edgeworth and his allies were able to successfully incriminate him and strip him of his power.

==== Simeon Saint ====
Voiced by (English): Jovette Rivera

Simeon Saint (猿代 草太, Sarushiro Sōta) was a clown who worked for Berry Big Circus, specifically under Regina. Edgeworth first encountered him at the detention center, where he was accused of murdering his close friend, Bronco Knight (内藤 馬乃介, Naitō Manosuke).

He appeared at first to be a very shy and nervous individual who panicked when confronted. However, this was all a facade to mask his true nature as a bitter man who was a master manipulator, despite an apparent lack of actual power. His greatest asset was a knowledge of individuals and their character, which he used to create scenarios that would lead to his desired result.

=== The Great Ace Attorney series ===
==== Yujin Mikotoba ====
Yujin Mikotoba (御琴羽 悠仁, Mikotoba Yūjin) was a forensic pathologist at Yumei Imperial University, and the father of Susato. He instructed Ryunosuke to defend himself in court, setting into motion the events that would lead him to become a lawyer. He similarly prepared Susato defend her friend, despite her gender legally precluding her ability to do so. He also served as a mentor figure to Kazuma Asogi, being close with his late father, Genshin Asogi (亜双義 玄真, Asōgi Genshin).

During his time as exchange student in England, Yujin became acquainted with a young Herlock Sholmes, leading to the pair going on a number of adventures together. He becomes more actively involved in the last case, performing Resolve's final dance of deduction with his old friend.

==== Taketsuchi Auchi ====
Taketsuchi Auchi (亜内 武土, Auchi Taketsuchi) was the prosecutor presiding over the first trial of Adventures, as well as an ancestor to the Payne family. Like his descendants, he was rather smug but easy to rattle. He had a dislike for the changes brought by the country's treaty with Britain, and could not speak English. He was also somewhat derisive towards "yokels", a term which he took to calling Susato in her male persona, Ryutaro Naruhodo. Upon the loss of each trial, he cut off his topknot in a manner reminiscent of seppuku.

==== Seishiro Jigoku ====
Seishiro Jigoku (慈獄 政士郎, Jigoku Seishirō) was a supreme court judge and Japan's Minister of Foreign Affairs. He presided over both Japanese trials in the Great Ace Attorney duology. He displayed a willingness to bend the law for those close to him.

This resulted in oddities like a last minute in switch in defense to ensure Kazuma's trip abroad, and knowingly allowing a girl to act as a defense attorney (with Japan's laws outlawing such a practice) due to her being the daughter of an old friend.

He was close to Yujin and Genshin, with the trio all being exchange students to England. He was a powerful man, known to shatter an entire witness stand when angry.

==== Mael Stronghart ====
Mael Stronghart (ハート・ヴォルテックス, Hāto Vorutekkusu; Hart Vortex) was London's Lord Chief Justice during Ryunosuke's stay in London. He allowed Ryunosuke to practice law in the city, after he successfully defended a trial with minimal preparation. He was described as being as thoroughly intimidating man.

He was also the secret leader of an organization known as The Reaper, effectively inventing the stigma around van Zieks, by organizing assassinations of criminals who could not be found guilty in court. He intended to further solidify his power by becoming Her Majesty's Attorney General, in order to create crime-free London, but his schemes were laid bare before the Queen, leading to his arrest.

He serves as the main antagonist of the duology.

==== Tobias Gregson ====
Tobias Gregson (トバイアス・グレグソン, Tobaiasu Gureguson) was a Scotland Yard detective who worked on a majority of the cases Ryunosuke defended in London. He was characterized as a rival to Sholmes' in his stories, which led him to curry favor with Iris, due to the subsequent boost in reputation and salary resulting from it. He showed a love for fish and chips, being seen almost exclusively with a takeaway in hand.

The detective had a dark side, with his desire to defend his country leading him to commit a variety of heinous actions. He notably cut a deal with a criminal, to prevent him from leaking state secrets. After his death, he was revealed as a strategist for The Reaper, helping to plot extrajudicial assassinations.

==== Gina Lestrade ====
Gina Lestrade (ジーナ・レストレード, Jīna Resutorēdo) was an pickpocketing orphan from the streets who showed a strong dislike and distrust of authority. She was the final defendant in Adventures, accused of murdering shopkeeper, Pop Windibank (ハッチ・ウィンデバンク, Hatchi Windebanku; Hatch Windibank). Despite being charged with pettier crimes, Naruhodo's defense ultimately prevented her from being indicted for murder.

After serving her sentence, she began to rethink her opinion on authority, serving as a pupil under Gregson up until his untimely death. Despite their initially antagonistic relationship, she managed to touch his heart in a way no other could, making him rethink the various awful acts he performed as a detective, in light of her newfound admiration.

==== Klint van Zieks ====
Klint van Zieks (クリムト・バンジークズ, Kurimuto Banjīkuzu; Krimmet van Zieks) was a prosecutor who was murdered before the time of Adventures. He was the beloved elder brother of Barok, with his murder at the hands of a Japanese man dubbed "the Professor" becoming the impetus for his racism against the Japanese.

In truth, Klint was the infamous "Professor." He wished to rid London of corrupt law officials, but was co-opted by Stronghart after he discovered his identity. Feeling guilt over his crimes, he enlisted his friend, Genshin Asogi to kill him in a duel to the death, but not before writing a document revealing the truth. However, Stronghart managed to fabricate evidence implicating Genshin, leading him to take the fall, before the document was unearthed several years later.
