= Isker =

Isker may refer to:

== People ==
- Abder Isker (1920–2010), French Algerian film director, great-uncle of Akim Isker
- Akim Isker (born 1978), French Algerian film director and actor

== Places ==
- Îsker, the Siberian Tatar name for Qashliq, a medieval Siberian Tatar city
- Isker River, an alternative spelling of the Iskar River in Bulgaria
