= S Petit Nico =

French singer and producer

S Petit Nico is a French singer, songwriter and record producer.

He has composed songs for many artists, including Grand Corps Malade, Rouda, Souleymane Diamanka and Ami Karim. He was also a pianist for Grand Corps Malade in his launching years in 2006 à 2007, and later with Kery James between 2008 and 2010. His compositions have also been used in theater works, in films in advertisements. With music in more than 30 shorts, he is the composer for the "La Famille" collective directed by Jacky Ido. He has taken part in many events including Les FrancoFolies de Montréal and Café de la Danse.

== Discography ==
=== Studio albums ===
- 2002: Petit Nico (self-produced)

Track list:

1. Seul
2. J'aime
3. Histoire de détail (feat Koko & Lordeul)
4. La Différence (Fix M Cobra)
5. Julie (feat Koko)
6. Une Donnée
7. Silver (Stereo)
8. 2 Visions
9. Ouverture
10. Bonus Track
- 2012: Humain

Track list:

1. Grandes âmes
2. Bidonville
3. Humains
4. Ce Monde
5. Courant
6. Femme
7. Une caresse de printemps
8. Aujourd'hui
9. Mélodie de mots
10. Bien à vous
11. Yankoff
12. Un homme en colère

=== EPs ===
- 2008: Si j'étais un homme

Track list:

1. Si j'étais un homme
2. Le mec chelou
3. Prendre son pied en main
4. Il et elle

=== Collaborations ===
==== Discs ====
- 2006: Composer of 10 tracks in Grand Corps Malade album Midi 20 and album producer (Anouche Productions / AZ (label) / Universal) (Charts: FR #3, BEL #4, SWI #28)
- 2006: Composer and producer of "Muse amoureuse" on Souleymane Diamanka album L’hiver Peul (Anakroniq/Barclay Records/Universal)
- 2007: Won two Victoires de la musique awards for "Album revelation" and "Artist revelation on stage" for Midi 20
- 2007: Composer of "Je voulais juste que tu m'aimes" by Amel Bent (Jive-Epic/Sony BMG Music Entertainment)
- 2007: Composer and producer of 8 tracks for Ami Karim album Éclipse totale (Virgin/EMI Group)
- 2007: Composer and producer of 6 tracks don Rouda album Musique des lettres (Les Chants du Monde/Harmonia Mundi)
- 2008: Composer of 5 tracks on Grand Corps Malade's second album Enfant de la ville (Anouche Productions / AZ label / Universal) (FR #2, BEL #6, SWI #15)
- 2008: Composer of 2 tracks Sancho's Imagine EP (Artside / Believe Digital)
- 2010: Composer of track "Roméo kiffe Juliette" on the third album of Grand Corps Malade 3ème temps (Anouche productions / AZ (label) / Universal)

==== Live ====
- 2006-2007: Pianist and musical director for "Midi 20" tour for Grand Corps Malade
- 2008-2010: Pianist and musical arrangement for "A l'ombre du show-bizness" and "Réel" tours by Kery James
- 2010: Pianist and record producer for Lyor's No Mad Land project (129h Productions)

== Soundtracks ==
- 2008: Ma Poubelle Géante directed by Uda Benyamina
- 2008: Dead Buddy directed by Cédric Ido
- 2009: Lauréat Composer for emergence (L'Université d'été internationale du cinéma) for "Tous les chats sont gris (la nuit)" directed by Savina Dellicour
- 2011: Co-composer for cartoon Au loin directed by Studio Kippik

== Theater (music) ==
- 2003: Suzanne by Collectif Quatre Ailes
- 2005: Sir Semoule..., par le Collectif Quatre Ailes
- 2006: Des factures... Des gens... Et une petite histoire d'amour, directed by Yacine Belhousse
- 2009: Le projet RW by Collectif Quatre Ailes
- 2011: La Belle au bois de Jules Supervielle, by Collectif Quatre Ailes
- 2012: L'Oiseau bleu of Maurice Maeterlinck, par le Collectif Quatre Ailes

== Advertisements ==
- 2009: Spot Citroën "C5 Snow Motion"
- 2009: Spot Wrangler "Why"

== In popular culture ==
- 2009: Took part in Kery James's "Désolé", a charity song for Espoir pour Haiti with various artists: Amel Bent, Awa Imani, Beethova Obas, Christophe Maé, Davy Sicard, Diam's, Jacob Desvarieux, Jena Lee, Kayna Samet, Kenza Farah, Kery James, Natasha St-Pier, Souad Massi, S Petit Nico, Tiken Jah Fakoly, William Baldé, Youssou N'Dour
