= Frédéric Yonnet =

French musician (born 1973)

Frederic Yonnet
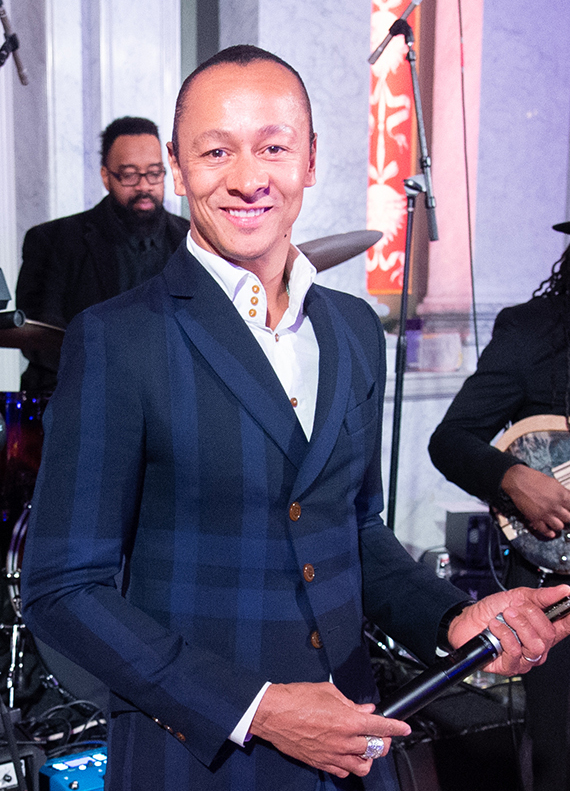
- Yonnet in 2020

Background information
- Born: 30 April 1973 (age 53)
- Origin: Pont l'Eveque, Calvados, France
- Genres: R&B, hip hop soul, soul, neo soul, jazz fusion
- Occupations: Musician, record producer
- Instruments: Harmonica, drums
- Years active: 1994–present
- Website: fredyonnet.com

Frédéric Yonnet (born 30 April 1973) is a French musician, producer and recording artist who is best known for his use of the harmonica as a lead in jazz, R&B, funk, gospel and hip-hop influenced music. His ability to play chromatic scales on a diatonic harmonica gives him access to twice as many notes as the instrument is designed to deliver.

Described by Rolling Stone as Prince's "killer harmonica player", Yonnet gained popularity for his on-stage performance with music icon Prince and his harmonica duels with the legendary Stevie Wonder. Yonnet has performed and recorded with a wide range of artists, including David Foster, Robbie Robertson, Erykah Badu, John Legend, India Arie, Angie Stone, Kindred The Family Soul, Justin Bieber, Randy Jackson, The Jonas Brothers and Grand Corps Malade.

== Career ==
=== Early life ===
Yonnet was born in Pont L'Eveque, Normandy, France. He is the younger of two sons born to French-Guyanese mother, Armande (Galas) Yonnet and Dominique Yonnet, a French civil engineer and part-time comedian and theater actor. His paternal grandfather, Jacques Yonnet, was the noted French artist, writer and author of Paris Noir, a memoir about Paris during the Nazi Occupation.

As a child, Yonnet and his father performed as a comedy duo in small theaters across France. By the age of 14, he started playing drums and after demonstrating considerable promise as a drummer, he was selected to perform at the Marciac Jazz Festival.

Throughout his childhood, Yonnet suffered with asthma. By 19, he decided to revisit an instrument he had as a child, the harmonica. After dedicating time to mastering the instrument, he noticed a significant decrease in his asthma attacks. Today, he carries a harmonica instead of an inhaler and his past experiences as a drummer influence his rhythmic and percussive style of harmonica playing.

=== Music career ===
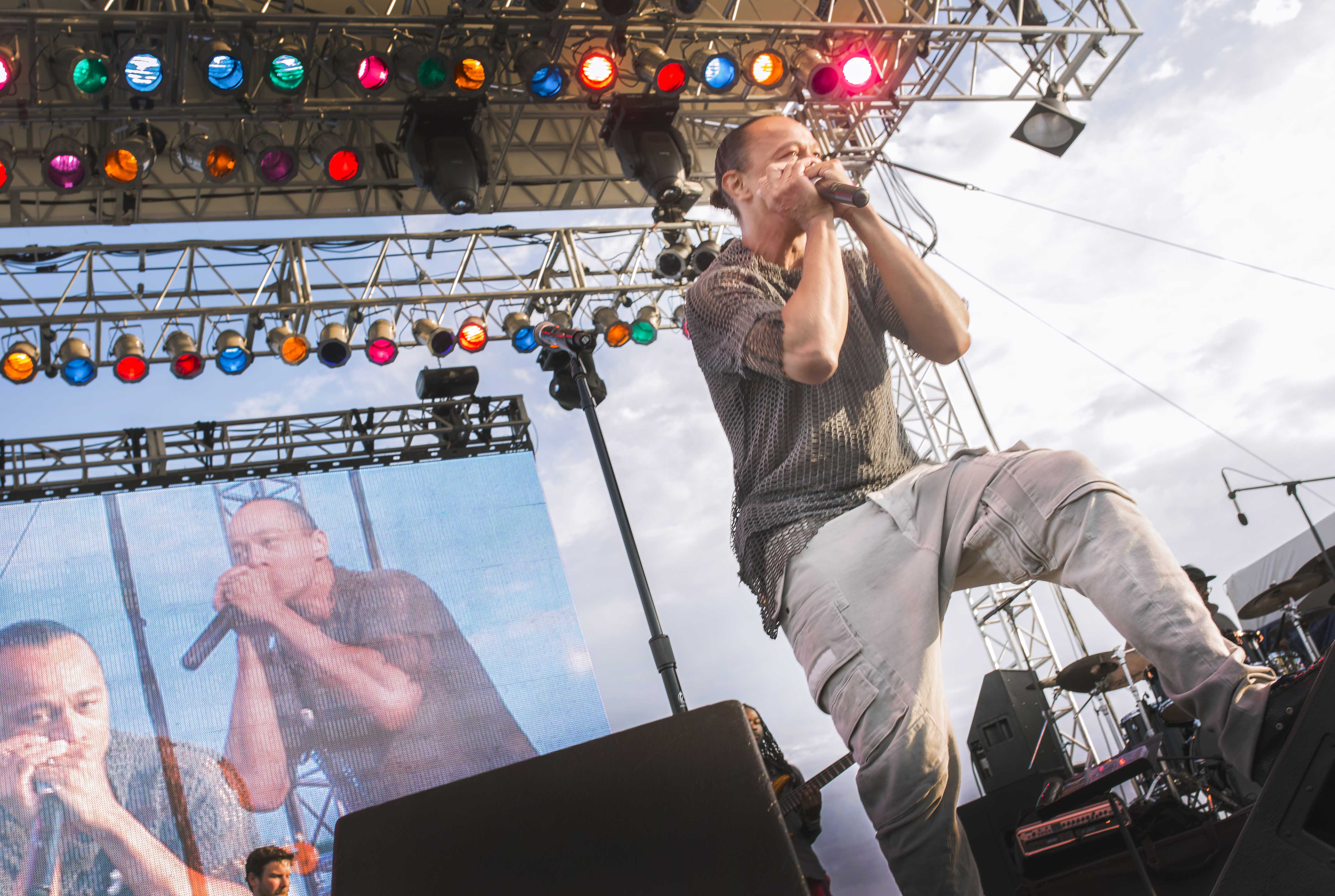
Yonnet at DC Jazz Fest 2014

Yonnet's music career began as a drummer but was short-lived as he was frequently fired from bands for trying to play the lead. As a harmonica player he performed as a sideman and featured artist in numerous bands in France, including Blue Fever, all the while observing the style of great trumpet players, saxophonists, and bandleaders. He was a frequent guest on the French television network Canal Plus' Nulle Part Ailleurs, performing with Lol et le Groupe.

In 1998, while performing at the Cannes Film Festival, Yonnet met several Americans who encouraged him to showcase his talent in the United States. In 2001, Yonnet moved to Washington, DC, where he performed in area festivals and clubs, quickly developing a reputation as a "genre-bending" harmonica player. He released a sampler CD titled Blowing Your Mind in Every Key of the Harp, which comprised five tracks, including "Amazing Grace" recorded live at the West Angeles Church of God in Christ, Los Angeles, CA. Six additional songs were added to the sampler CD and it was ultimately renamed and released in 2005 as Front & Center.

After hearing Yonnet's music, comedian Dave Chappelle invited him to make guest appearances during Chappelle's 10-city Block Party Concert tour in 2006. Later that year, Yonnet, along with Erykah Badu and Goapele, were invited to perform at the AACW Blues Festival (Yellow Springs, Ohio) hosted by Chappelle.

During Chappelle's introduction of Yonnet at Bluesfest, he tells the story of how he introduced Yonnet to Stevie Wonder when they were backstage at the 2006 Grammy Awards. "[Fred] pulled his harmonica out of his pocket in front of Stevie Wonder and I said 'Damn', and he started playing that harmonica, I was scared for him… and Stevie started doing like this, [swaying back and forth] now they hang out every Tuesday and Thursday."

Yonnet and Wonder have performed together numerous times, often teasing the crowd with a competitive rendition of Wonder's "Boogie On Reggae Woman". It was during a Stevie Wonder concert at New York's Madison Square Garden when Prince first saw Yonnet perform. Several months later, Yonnet was invited to record and ultimately tour with Prince.

In 2014, Wonder tapped Yonnet to perform harmonica parts on the Songs in the Key of Life Tour, 2014–15. Wonder performed the entire double album as part of the 44-city tour celebrating the 40th anniversary of the most critically acclaimed album of his career. Performing on the tunes, "Have a Talk with God" and "Mama's Call", Yonnet demonstrated his mastery of the diatonic harmonica by expertly mimicking the chromatic melody Wonder originally performed on the studio album.

=== Reality CD ===
In 2010, in a pioneering effort that combined technology, art and reality, Yonnet halted all aspects of production on his most recent project – recording, packaging and video – to give fans access to the raw and rough cuts of his work at various stages of the creative process. Yonnet coined the term "Reality CD" to describe the bold concept of allowing fans to observe key phases of the production. Yonnet's work in progress, subtitled The Rough Cut, is available exclusively to fans purchasing digital download cards at live concerts and online. A unique code gives users access to The Rough Cut files. Email alerts announce when new material is available for download. Comments posted to the website will be considered in the subsequent Reed My Lips: The Final Mix, releasing in 2011 and eventually available on iTunes.

== Instrument and gear ==
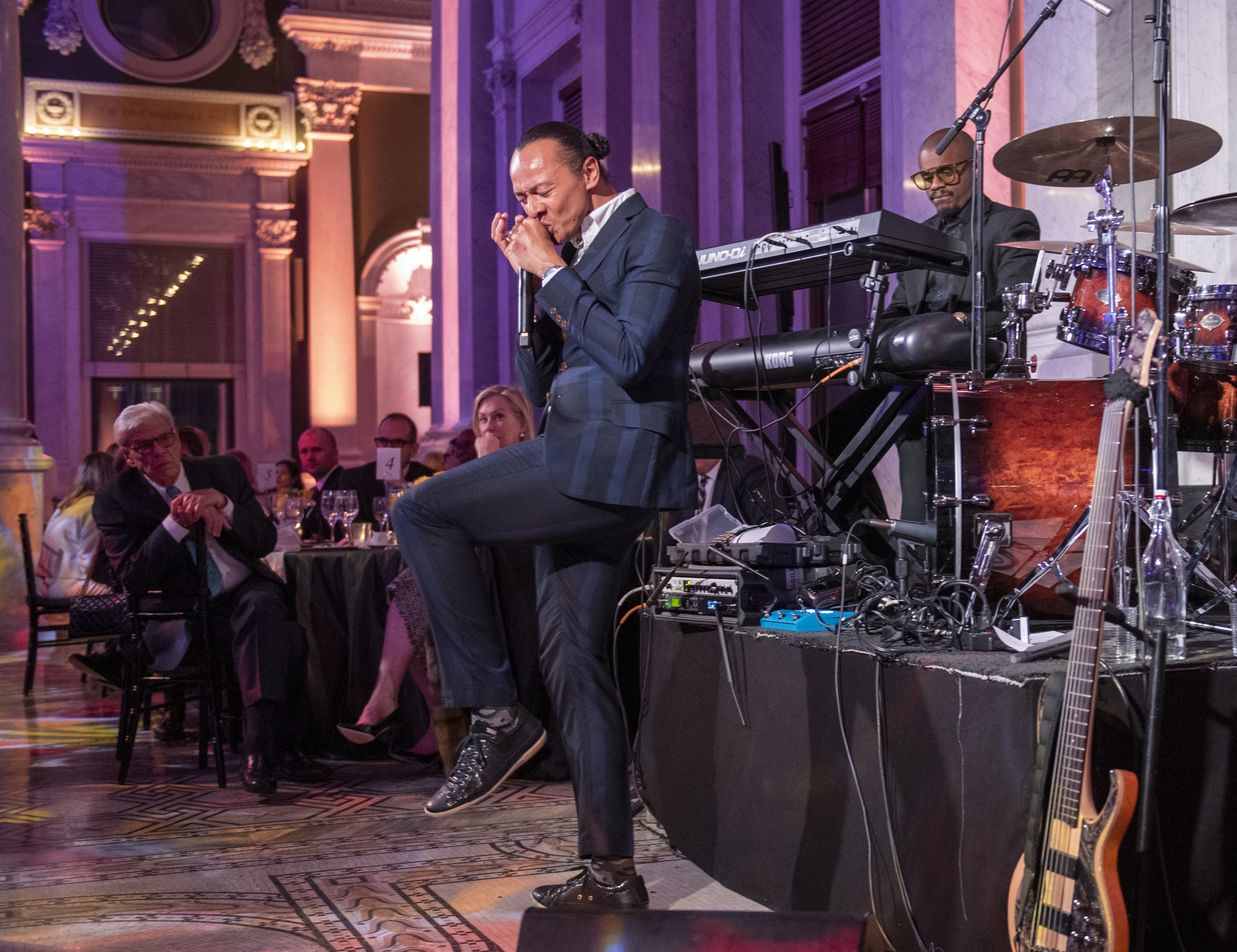
Yonnet performing in 2020

Yonnet exclusively plays 1847 Classic and Silver harmonicas, designed by C. A. Seydel Söhne, the oldest harmonica manufacturer in the world. Yonnet plays his harmonicas straight out of the box and they are not customized. He used Shure Beta 87A microphones and Ultimate Ears 11 Pro and UE reference monitors.

== Discography ==
=== Albums ===
- Blowing Your Mind In Every Key of the Harp (2001)
- Front & Center (2005)
- Reed My Lips: The Rough Cut (2010)

=== Collaborations ===
- Borders Jazz You Must Own, "Amazing Grace" (2001)
- Middle C Music Jazz All Stars, "Blues on Middle C"; "Jessie's Blues", "Peter's Rhythm", "Little Wing" and "Prelude and Samba" (2005)
- David Dyson, Unleashed, "Southern Fried Go Go" (2008)
- Randy Jackson, Randy Jackson's Music Club, Vol. 1, "Wang, Dang, Doodle" (2008)
- Jonas Brothers, Lines, Vines and Trying Times, "What Did I Do To Your Heart" (2009)
- Native Son, Son Talk (2010)
- Grand Corps Malade, 3ème temps (2010)
- Justin Bieber, My World 2.0, "U Smile" (2010)
- India Arie, Open Doors (TBD)
- Kindred The Family Soul, "Love Has No Recession" (2011)
- Anthony Hamilton, "MAD" (2011)
- The Touré-Raichel Collective, "Touré" (2012)
- Wayna, "Send it Away" (2013)
- Grand Corps Malade, Funambule (2013)
- Talib Kweli, "The One I Love" Radio Silence (2017)
- Robbie Robertson, "I Hear You Paint Houses" & "Remembrance" Sinematic (2019)
- Soundtrack for Martin Scorsese The Irishman (2019 film)
- Ibrahim Maalouf, "Election Night (Duo Version)" 40 Melodies (album) (2020)
- Mark Lettieri Deep: The Baritone Sessions Vol. 2 (2021)
- The Wailers Band, One World (2020) (Produced by Emilio Estefan "When Love is Right" Ft Julian Marley and Natiruts, "Only in Jamaica"
