= Soufiane Guerrab =

French actor (born 1987)

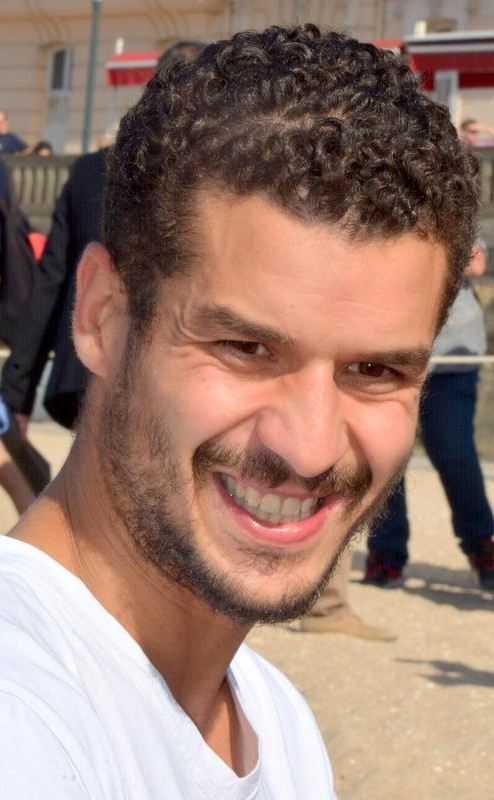
- Guerrab in 2017
- Born: 18 February 1987 (age 38); Paris, France
- Occupation: Actor
- Years active: 2006–present
- Known for: Lupin

Soufiane Guerrab is a French actor best known to international audiences for his role as police detective Youssef Guédira in the Netflix crime thriller series Lupin.

== Early life ==
Born to a Moroccan father and a mother of Italian and German descent, Guerrab grew up in Rosny-sous-Bois, in the eastern suburbs of Paris. Before getting into acting at the age of 18, he composed music.

== Career ==
Guerrab received his first major role in the series Les Beaux Mecs, followed by several supporting roles in the films The Measure of a Man, Dheepan, and Two Birds, One Stone. In 2017, he received the Rendez-vous Award at the Cabourg Film Festival for his role as Farid in the film Patients. In 2018, Guerrab created the Tapis Bleu film festival, based in Rosny-sous-Bois and sponsored by poet and filmmaker Grand Corps Malade.

Since 2021, Guerrab has appeared in the Netflix thriller series Lupin as Youssef Guédira, a detective attempting to track down the show's protagonist Assane Diop, played by Omar Sy.

He played a major role in the 2022 TF1 TV series Visions, which premiered at Canneseries that year. The show, directed by Akim Isker, also stars Louane Emera, Jean-Hugues Anglade, and Julien Boisselier.

== Filmography ==
=== Film ===
List of film appearances, with year, title, and role shown
Year	Title	Role	Notes
2006	Girlfriends	Alexandre	
2009	Tellement proches	Francky	
2009	District 13: Ultimatum	Guy at the supermarket	
2012	Paulette	Zak	
2015	The Night Watchman	Ziad	
2015	The Measure of a Man	Arrested young man	
2015	Dheepan	Guard	
2015	All Three of Us	Elyess	
2016	Two Birds, One Stone	Marcel / Mars	
2017	Patients	Farid	
2017	Burn Out	Man at motorway rest stop	
2019	School Life		

=== Television ===
List of television appearances, with year, title, and role shown
Year	Title	Role	Notes
2011	Les Beaux Mecs	Kenz	8 episodes
2013	The Tunnel	Yacine Cherfi	2 episodes
2014	Julie Lescaut		1 episode
2016	Braquo	Majid Aquati	3 episodes
2018	Call My Agent!	Sami Abadi, server	1 episode
2019	Spiral	Kader	3 episodes
2022	Visions	Romain Sauvant	6 episodes
2021–present	Lupin	Youssef Guedira	17 episodes

== Awards and nominations ==
Year	Ceremony	Award	Work	Result
2017	Cabourg Film Festival	Rendez-vous Award	Patients	Won
