= Julien Boisselier =

French actor

Julien Boisellier
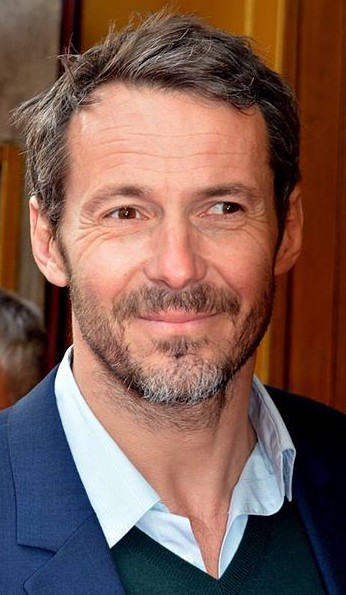
- Boisellier in 2015
- Born: Nantes, Loire-Atlantique, France
- Occupation: Actor
- Years active: 1996–present

Julien Boisselier is a French actor.

== Early life and education ==
Julien Boisselier was born and raised in Nantes, before moving to Paris to study comedy at Le Cours Florent.

== Career ==
Boisselier has acted in many films and television series.

He stars in the TF1 2022 French TV series Visions, which premiered at Canneseries that year. The series, directed by directed by Akim Isker, also stars Louane Emera, Soufiane Guerrab , and Jean-Hugues Anglade.

== Personal life ==
He dated French actress Mélanie Laurent for some time until February 2009. She dedicated her 2006 César Award for Most Promising Actress to him, which she won for Je vais bien, ne t'en fais pas.

== Filmography ==
=== Film ===
- Dans un grand vent de fleurs (1996)
- De gré ou de force (1998)
- Nationale 7 (2000)
- Azzurro (2000)
- Quand on sera grand (2001)
- Les Portes de la gloire (2001)
- Un jeu d'enfants (2001)
- Les Acteurs anonymes (2001)
- Aime ton père (2002)
- Nos enfants chéris (2003)
- Le Convoyeur (2004)
- Clara et moi (2004)
- J'me sens pas belle (2004)
- Tout le plaisir est pour moi (2004)
- J'ai plein de projets (2006)
- On va s'aimer (2006)
- Je vais bien, ne t'en fais pas (2006)
- La dix-septième marche (2007)
- J'veux pas que tu t'en ailles (2007)
- Cortex (2007)
- Les femmes de l'ombre (2008)
- Cochon de Morin (2008)
- De moins en moins (2008)
- Skhizein (2008)
- Les dents de la nuit (2008)
- Henri IV (2009) as Henry of Navarre
- Sleepless Night (2011)
- The Chef (2012) by Daniel Cohen
- Jamais le premier soir (2014)
- Bis (2015)
- Marseille (2016)
- Sous le même toit (2017)
- Mr. & Mrs. Adelman (2017)
- Quand on crie au loup (2019)

=== Television ===
- La Deuxième Vérité (2001)
- Une deuxième chance (2003)
- La peine d'une mère (2004)
- Nos vies rêvées (2004)
- La nuit du meurtre (2004)
- Tout va bien, c'est Noël (2004)
- La parenthèse interdite (2005)
- Celle qui reste (2005)
- Le Grand Charles (2006)
- Des fleurs pour Algernon (2006)
- Vive la colo ! (2012–2013)
- Nina (2018)
- Les copains d'abord (2020)
- Visions (2022)

== Theatre ==
- Vie privée by Philip Barry (2009)
