= Midi 20 =

Studio album by Grand Corps Malade
- Released: March 27, 2006
- Recorded: 2005
- Genre: Slam
- Length: 54:29
- Label: AZ
- Producer: Jean-Rachid for Anouche Productions; S Petit Nico, Seb Mo, Baptiste Charvet

Grand Corps Malade chronology
Midi 20 (2006)	Enfant de la ville (2008)

Midi 20 is the first studio album from Grand Corps Malade. The album sold over 600,000 copies.

== Track listing ==
1. "Le jour se lève"
2. "Saint-Denis"
3. "Je dors sur mes 2 oreilles"
4. "Midi 20"
5. "Ça peut chémar" (duet with John Pucc'Chocolat)
6. "6ème sens"
7. "Je connaissais pas Paris le matin"
8. "Chercheur de phases"
9. "Parole du bout du monde" (duet with Rouda)
10. "Attentat verbal"
11. "Les voyages en train"
12. "J'ai oublié"
13. "Vu de ma fenêtre"
14. "Rencontres"
15. "Ma tête, mon coeur et mes couilles"
16. "Toucher l'instant"

== Personnel ==
- Production: Jean-Rachid for Anouche Productions
- Artistic director: S Petit Nico
- Sound engineer / Mixing: Nico (staf) Stawski
- Music by: S Petit Nico (tracks 1, 3, 5, 6, 8, 9, 11, 12, 13, 14, 16), Baptiste Charvet (track 4)

== Charts ==
=== Weekly charts ===
Chart (2006)	Peak position
Belgian Albums (Ultratop Wallonia)	4
French Albums (SNEP)	3
Swiss Albums (Schweizer Hitparade)	28

=== Year-end charts ===
Chart (2006)	Position
Belgian Albums (Ultratop Wallonia)	26
French Albums (SNEP)	10

Chart (2007)	Position
French Albums (SNEP)	45

== Awards ==
Grand Corps Malade earned two Victoires de la musique awards for "Album révélation of the year" and "Artist stage révélation of the year" in 2007 for his work on album Midi 20
