= Funambule =

Funambule means tightrope walker in the French language. Specifically it may refer to:

- the Funambule funicular, a funicular railway in the Swiss city of Neuchâtel
- the Funambule (album), the fourth studio album of Grand Corps Malade
- the Théâtre des Funambules, a former theater in Paris, France
