= Va bene (song) =

2014 single by La Fouine featuring Reda Taliani

Single by La Fouine featuring Reda Taliani

from the album Capitale du crime 4
- Released: 2014
- Genre: hip-hop, Raï
- Length: 3:41
- Label: Banlieue Sale

"Va Bene" is a multilingual song by La Fouine featuring singer Reda Taliani. It included lyrics in French, Northern African colloquial Arabic and some Italian. Appearing in La Fouine's mixtape Capitale du crime 4 on Banlieue Sale Music, it was released as a single. The single found minimal charting success, as it reached number 78 on SNEP, the official French Singles Chart. The song stayed a total of 8 weeks in the French Top 200.

== Music video ==
The music video filmed in Morocco and was directed by Glenn Smith. It features a boy infatuated with football. But his father wants him to quit and lend a helping hand in herding the sheep. Frustrated by this, the boy runs away from home and finds himself in a larger Moroccan city where he becomes a street vendor. There he meets La Fouine and while trying to sell him a merchandise, he also offers to La Fouine a cup of tea. La Fouine touched by the boy's gesture gives him a considerable tip with which the boy is able to buy a football shirt from another street vendor carrying the name and number 23 of his favorite player the Brazilian David Luiz who at the time was playing for Paris Saint-Germain.

== Chart performance ==
Chart	Peak position
France (SNEP)	3
