= Inch'Allah (Grand Corps Malade song) =

Single by Grand Corps Malade featuring Reda Taliani
- Released: October 2011
- Recorded: 2011
- Genre: Slam, Contemporary folk music
- Length: 4:12
- Label: AZ / Universal Music France
- Songwriters: Grand Corps Malade, Greg Kasparian
- Producer: Tefa

Grand Corps Malade singles chronology
"Définitivement" (2010)	"Inch'Allah" (2011)

Reda Taliani singles chronology
"Inch'Allah" (2011)

Music video
- "Inch'Allah" on YouTube

Inch'Allah is a single of French slam poet Grand Corps Malade featuring French-Algerian singer Reda Taliani and is the first charting success of Grand Corps Malade in the French Singles Chart. The lyrics are by Grand Corps Malade and the music by Greg Kasparian. The single was produced by Tefa.

== Charts ==
It was released in October 2011 and charted the first time on 5 November 2011 at #90 in its week of release, eventually reaching #59 its highest position in the French Singles Chart.

Chart (2011)	Peak position
French SNEP Singles Chart	59

== Music video ==
The music video directed by Mehdi Idir portrays a wedding of a friend of Grand Corps Malade. When Grand Corps Malade sees the disastrous musical act hired for the wedding party, he pitches in to "save" the wedding party by calling on the help of Reda Taliani and some fellow musicians, winning the previously bored invitees over with his poetry and song.

Although the song is meant to be a wedding song, Grand Corps Malade uses the opportunity turning it into a "wish list" of what he aspires in seeing in French society through his slam poetry, with Reda Taliani responding to his "list" with "Inch'Allah" (God willing in Arabic).

A number of artists, athletes and French celebrities make cameo appearances in the music video including former tennis player and artist Yannick Noah, footballer Lilian Thuram, comedian, actor and radio and TV personality Eric Judor, actress Mathilda May, DJ Abdel, rappers Rim'K, Kamini, Soprano, as well as Tunisiano and Aketo (both from hip hop band Sniper).
