= School Life (2019 film) =

2019 French teen comedy drama film

- Film poster
- French: La Vie scolaire
- Directed by: Grand Corps Malade; Mehdi Idir
- Produced by: Grand Corps Malade; Mehdi Idir
- Starring: Liam Pierron; Zita Hanrot; Moussa Monsaly
- Music by: Angelo Foley
- Distributed by: Netflix
- Release date: 28 August 2019
- Running time: 111 minutes
- Country: France
- Languages: French; Arabic
- Budget: $5.10 million
- Box office: $14.2 million

School Life (French: La Vie scolaire) is a 2019 French teen comedy drama film written and directed by Grand Corps Malade and Mehdi Idir. The film stars Liam Pierron, Zita Hanrot and Moussa Monsaly in the lead roles. The film was released in France on 28 August 2019 and received positive reviews from critics becoming a box office success. The film was streamed via Netflix on 10 April 2020. It also received a number of awards and nominations at international film festivals.

== Plot summary ==
The new vice principal of a middle school in the suburb of Paris, Saint-Denis, Samia is warned by her fellow teachers that students are unmotivated and do not abide by discipline. She sees things in a completely different manner compared to others. However, when she gets to know the students, especially Yanis who is quite sharp and intelligent but disillusioned by a world that seems to have turned its back on him and his family, she tries her best to help him become more motivated to improve his grades and pursue a future in film.

== Cast ==
- Liam Pierron as Yanis Bensaadi
- Zita Hanrot as Samia Zibra
- Moussa Mansaly as Moussa
- Alban Ivanov as Dylan
- Soufiane Guerrab as Messaoud
- Antoine Reinartz as Thierry Bouchard
- Hocine Mokando as Farid Hammoudi

== Awards and nominations ==
| Year | Award | Category | Result |
|---|---|---|---|
| 2019 | Seville European Film Festival | Cinephiles of the Future Award | Won |
| 2020 | César Awards | Most Promising Actor (Liam Pierron) | Nominated |
| 2020 | Globes do Cristal Awards | Schwab Film | Nominated |
| 2020 | Globes do Cristal Awards | Best Actress (Zita Hanrot) | Nominated |
