= Sinematic =

Studio album by Robbie Robertson
- Released: September 20, 2019
- Genre: Rock
- Length: 58:16
- Label: UME Direct

Robbie Robertson chronology
How to Become Clairvoyant (2011)	Sinematic (2019)

Professional ratings
Aggregate scores
Source	Rating
Metacritic	64/100
Review scores
Source	Rating
AllMusic	3/5 stars
American Songwriter	4/5 stars
Rolling Stone	3.5/5 stars
Uncut	7/10

Sinematic is the sixth solo release from Canadian singer-musician Robbie Robertson. It was released on September 20, 2019 and his final studio album, prior to his death in 2023. The tracks "I Hear You Paint Houses" and "Remembrance" both appear in the credits for the film The Irishman.

== Track listing ==
No.	Title	Length
1.	"I Hear You Paint Houses" (featuring Van Morrison and Frédéric Yonnet)	5:03
2.	"Once Were Brothers" (featuring Citizen Cope and Frédéric Yonnet)	4:24
3.	"Dead End Kid"	3:58
4.	"Hardwired"	3:58
5.	"Walk in Beauty Way"	5:37
6.	"Let Love Reign"	5:11
7.	"Shanghai Blues"	3:51
8.	"Wandering Souls"	2:33
9.	"Street Serenade"	5:06
10.	"The Shadow"	4:26
11.	"Beautiful Madness"	4:30
12.	"Praying for Rain"	4:11
13.	"Remembrance" (featuring Derek Trucks and Frédéric Yonnet) (bonus track)	5:28

== Personnel ==
Adapted from AllMusic.

- Robbie Robertson – vocals, keyboards, guitar, cover painting
- Jim Keltner – drums
- Pino Palladino – bass guitar
- Frédéric Yonnet – harmonica
- Afie Jurvanen – guitar, keyboards
- Jim Wilson – keyboards, programming
- Derek Trucks – slide guitar
- Terry And The Octo Pirates – guitar, Hammond organ
- Reggie Hamilton – bass guitar
- Howie B. – keyboards, programming
- Randy Kerber – keyboards, Hammond organ
- George Doering – guitar
- Martin Pradler – keyboards, percussion
- J.S. Ondara – backing vocals
- Felicity Williams – backing vocals
- Citizen Cope – backing vocals
- Laura Satterfield - vocals on 5

== Charts ==
Chart (2019)	Peak position
Scottish Albums (OCC)	50
Belgian Albums (Ultratop Flanders)	174
US Americana/Folk Albums (Billboard)	7
US Top Album Sales (Billboard)	17
