= Kimberose =

French singer-songwriter (born 1991)

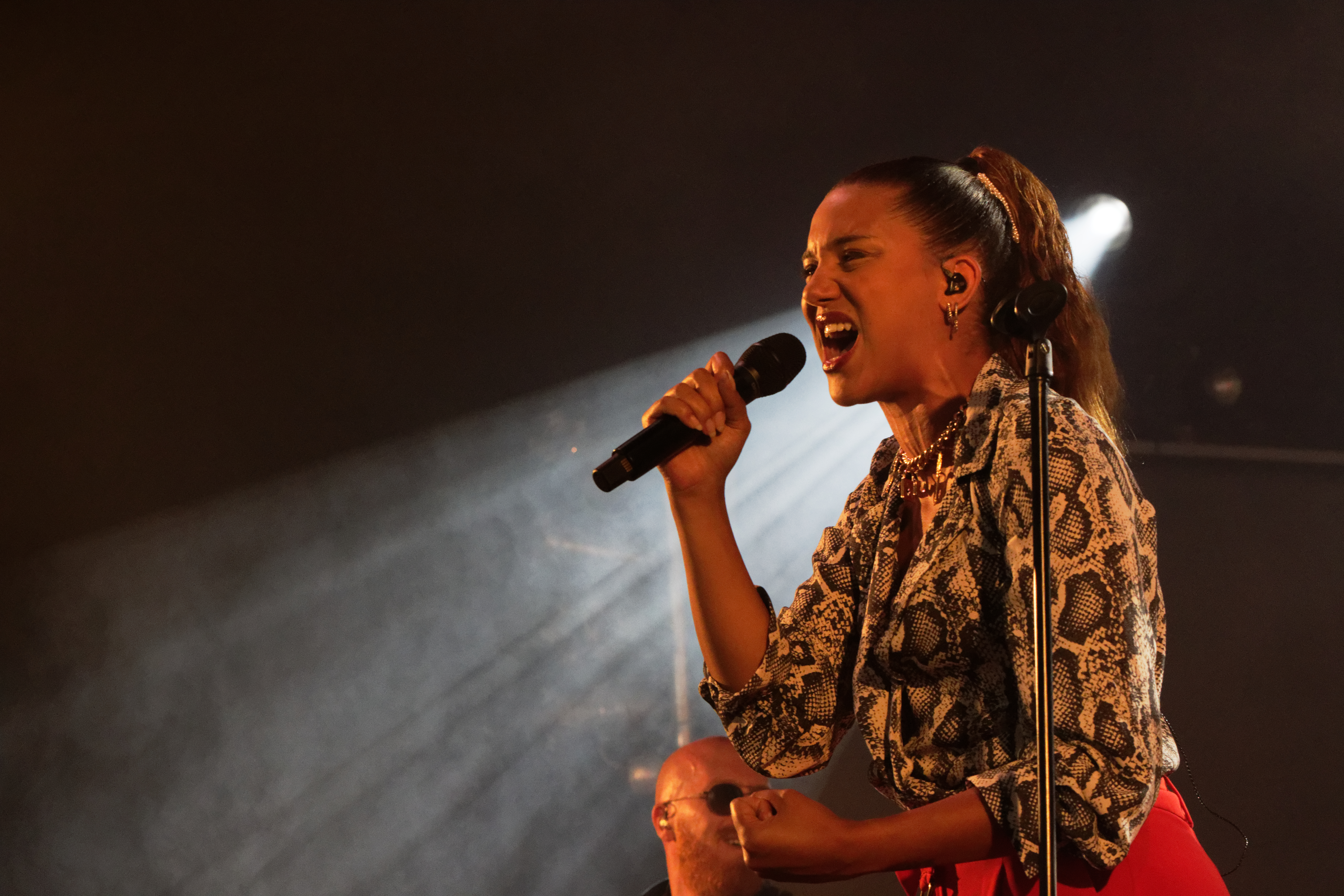
- Kitson-Mills with Kimberose at the Festival du bout du monde in 2019

Background information
- Born: Kimberley Kitson-Mills; 23 July 1991 (age 35); Athis-Mons, Essonne, France
- Genres: Pop; pop-soul; soul
- Years active: 2013–present
- Labels: Freedonia Entertainment, Label Six et Sept
- Website: kimberose-official.com

Kimberly Rose Kitson-Mills, better known by her stage name Kimberose, born in 1991 in Athis-Mons, is an English-French singer-songwriter and frontwoman of the homonymous band Kimberose, formed in 2015.

== Biography ==
=== Early life and Nouvelle Star ===
Kimberly Rose Kitson-Mills was born on 23 July 1991 in Athis-Mons in Essonne, with an English father, George Kitson-Mills, and a Ghanaian mother. Until the age of twelve, she lived in the suburbs of London, before moving to Chantilly in 2017.

Although she never took singing lessons, Kitson-Mills sang from a young age, listening mostly to pop music:

"Je chante depuis que je suis toute petite. Le premier album que j’ai acheté c’est The Miseducation de Lauryn Hill que j’écoute encore aujourd'hui. J'ai d'abord écouté de la pop. Je suis de la génération Britney Spears. J’ai commencé à écouter de la soul quand j’ai rencontré Anthony et Alex, j’ai découvert Billie Holiday, Etta James, Nina Simone, Sam Cooke..." English translation: "I've sung since I was a toddler. The first album I bought was The Miseducation of Lauryn Hill, which I still listen to today. I primarily listened to pop music. I'm of the Britney Spears generation. I started to listen to soul when I met Anthony and Alex, I discovered Billy Holiday, Etta James, Nina Simone, Sam Cooke..."

Aged eighteen, Kitson-Mills was a psychology student, but dropped out of the course to become an offender profiler, stating that she was "too emotional for this job". However, while at university, she met Anthony Hadjadj, a guitarist and nurse, in front of whom she sang at his roommates's flat. Hadjadj would describe her as singing with a "perfect English accent, a bewitching emotion, a voice simply soul". In 2013, with advice form Hadjadj, Kitson-Mills applied to perform on the tenth season of the French reality music completion Nouvelle Star. Performing Pink Martini's single Sympathique (je ne veux pas travailler) and Des'ree's You Gotta Be, she advanced to the second prime time show on 19 December 2013. Kitson-Rose found the experience of the show negative, stating that it damaged her self confidence.

=== Band and Chapter One (2013—2020) ===
In 2013, with two other musicians, Hadjadj as a guitarist and Alex Delange as keyboardist (both of whom she had met whilst studying psychology), Kitson Mills started a new band. The band was formed with the help of the Société Pernod Ricard France Live Music, a French project which organises free public concerts and supports young French artists, hosting an annual competition to select its best new artists, as voted by the public. During the first year of the band's existence, they were located in a rented loft studio in Chantilly, composing forty songs for the competition. On 15 December 2015, the band Kimberose was formed, with the joining of bassist Paul Herry-Pasmanian and drummer Fred Drouillard.

Kitson-Rose received attention following an appearance of Kimberose on France 2's live music show Taratata on 29 September 2017, where she sang I'm Sorry, a song from the band's first extended play It's Probably Me, which was released the same day.

=== "Out" (2021—present) ===
On 21 January 2021, Kimberose released a solo album, Out.

== Members of Kimberose ==
- Kimberly Rose Kitson Mills – singer-songwriter
- Anthony Hadjadj – guitarist
- Thimothé — pianist
- Jérémy Louwerse – bassist

== Discography ==
=== Singles ===
- 2016 : 'About Us'
- 2017 : 'I'm Sorry'
- 2017 : 'It's Probably Me'
- 2018 : 'I'm A Fool'
- 2018 : 'Where Did You Sleep Last Night'
- 2018 : 'Smile'
- 2020 : Back on my Feet
- 2021 : 'Weak And Ok'
- 2021 : L'envie de valser
- 2021 : Nos plus belles années (with Grand Corps Malade)
