= Funambule (album) =

Studio album by Grand Corps Malade
- Released: 2013
- Genre: Slam
- Label: Believe Recording / Anouche Productions
- Producer: Ibrahim Maalouf (musical director)

Grand Corps Malade chronology
| 3ème temps (2010) | Funambule (2013) |

Funambule is the fourth studio album by French slam poet Grand Corps Malade, with musical direction by musician and trumpet player Ibrahim Maalouf. The 13-track album, released 28 October 2013, includes a track featuring Frédéric Yonnet, as well as three duets with Sandra Nkaké, Francis Cabrel and Richard Bohringer.

Funambule is Grand Corps Malade's first album produced with independent record label Believe Recording and Anouche Productions, after he left the commercial AZ label associated with Universal Music France.

The album release came after Grand Corps Malade published his successful book, Patients, which was later adapted into a movie.

== Track listing ==
1. "Au théâtre" (4:25)
2. "J'ai mis des mots" (featuring Fredéric Yonnet) (3:28)
3. "Le manège" (4:12)
4. "Te manquer" (duet with Sandra Nkaké) (4:06)
5. "Funambule" (4:35)
6. "Les lignes de la main" (2:14)
7. "Pause" (3:36)
8. "Le bout du tunnel" (4:21)
9. "La traversée" (duet with Francis Cabrel) (4:19)
10. "Les 5 sens" (3:35)
11. "Course contre la honte" (duet with Richard Bohringer) (6:19)
12. "Tant que les gens font l'amour" (4:49)
13. "Dans les vagues" (4:28) - (bonus track)

The physical album comes with a booklet titled Funambule by Grand Corps Malade.

== Special instrumental edition ==
The physical album also includes two free CDs; the first contains the musical tracks while the second has instrumental versions of the same songs.

== Charts ==
=== Weekly charts ===
| Chart (2013) | Peak position |
|---|---|
| Belgian Albums (Ultratop Wallonia) | 11 |
| French Albums (SNEP) | 5 |
| Swiss Albums (Schweizer Hitparade) | 34 |

=== Year-end charts ===
| Chart (2013) | Position |
|---|---|
| Belgian Albums (Ultratop Wallonia) | 122 |
| French Albums (SNEP) | 84 |
| Chart (2014) | Position |
| Belgian Albums (Ultratop Wallonia) | 116 |
| French Albums (SNEP) | 136 |
