= Reda Taliani =

Algerian raï musician

Reda Taliani رضى طلياني
- Born: Reda Tamni (رضى تمني); 1980 (age 45–46); El Biar, Algiers, Algeria
- Origin: Koléa, Tipaza, Algeria
- Genre: Raï
- Occupations: Singer and Musician
- Years active: 1985 – present
- Label: Dounia Production

Reda Tamni (Arabic: رضى تمني; born 1980 in El Biar, Algiers), known by his stage name Reda Taliani (Arabic: رضى طلياني), is an Algerian raï singer and musician. He is a longtime resident from Aubagne, Provence, France. His music blends chaabi, raï and traditional musical styles of the Maghreb, and many of his songs depict the realities and aspirations of the Algerian youth.

== Career ==
Born in El Biar, Algiers, from a Constantine-based family, Reda Taliani grew in Koléa, a town in Tipaza Province, in northern Algeria. His musical career started at 5 when he joined the Koléa Conservatory of Arab and Andalusian Music where he studied playing a number of instruments and excelled in playing the mandolin. He was captivated by raï music very early on and opted for leaving the more classical Andalusian music entirely devoting himself to raï. The name Taliani (the Italian) is a nickname given to him when he was just 8 because of the way he dressed.

Reda Taliani's first album entitled Ache Dani Elwahd Tayra was released in 2000 with producer Issame and Eleulma Phone. He stayed with the label until 2004 when he moved to Dounia Production label where he released his successful album Joséphine the same year. Since then he has found popularity and success mainly in Algeria with Les Algériens des Kamikazes and Khobz Dar. His music is widely influenced by Cheb Khaled and Sahraoui styles, but also by Bob Marley and Santana.

He has collaborated with many French artists, most notably the rap formation 113 on their album 113 Degrés. The single emanating from the collaboration entitled "Partir loin" was very successful. He was featured in Raï N B Fever 2 with the song "Cholé Cholé" with Rappeurs d'Instinct. He also sang "Ca passe où ça casse" with French rapper of Tunisian origin Tunisiano. In 2011, he collaborated with Grand Corps Malade on the track "Inch'allah"

== Discography ==
- Ache dani elwahd tayra
- Joséphine
- Bahr el Ghadar.
- Dis moi
- Loumina
- Khobz dar
- Les algériens des kamikhazes
- Suis-le, il te fuit, fuis-le, il te suit (El moudja li datou)
- Les algériens rassa
- Mon cœur n'aie pas peur
- Taaya Tebghini

=== Singles featured in ===
Year	Single	Peak positions	Album
Year	Single	FR	Album
2005	"Partir loin" (113 feat. Reda Taliani)	23	113 Degrés
2011	"Inch'Allah" (Grand Corps Malade feat. Reda Taliani)	59	
2014	"Va bene" (La Fouine feat. Reda Taliani) (Re-released in 2018)	3	
2023	"L'Etranger (feat. Don Bigg)		

=== Collaborations ===
- "Ca passe ou ca casse" (with Tunisiano)
- "Cholé Cholé" (with group Rappeurs d'Instinct)
- "Famille nombreuse" (feat rim'k and 113)
- "Raï Kaï" (with Lim feat Samira)
- "Inch'Allah" (Grand Corps Malade feat. Reda Taliani)
