= Visions (2022 TV series) =

French six-part drama series

- Created by: Bruno Dega; Jeanne Le Guillou
- Directed by: Akim Isker
- Starring: Louane Emera; Soufiane Guerrab; Jean-Hugues Anglade; Julien Boisselier
- Composer: Éric Neveux
- Country of origin: France
- No. of episodes: 6

Production
- Executive producers: Laurent Paul; Edouard de Vésinne; Michael Gentile; Lauraine Heftler; Pauline Éon
- Producer: Laurent Paul
- Running time: 6 x 50m
- Production company: Lingo Pictures & Luminous Beast

Original release
- Network: TF1
- Release: 16 May 2022

Visions, known in Australia as Beyond Signs, is a French TV series released in 2022 by commercial network TF1, starring Louane Emera and Soufiane Guerrab and directed by Akim Isker.

== Synopsis ==
The story centres on an investigation into a missing child, and young boy who appears to see strange visions.

== Cast ==
- Louane Emera
- Soufiane Guerrab
- Jean-Hugues Anglade
- Anne Marivin
- Julien Boisselier

== Production ==
Visions was created by Jeanne Le Guillou and Bruno Dega and directed by Akim Isker. It was co-produced by Pauline Éon of Hanoi Productions, and The Film TV.

Filming took place in the Provence-Alpes-Côte d'Azur region, and wrapped on 13 August 2021.Éric Neveux composed the music for the series.

As of 2022 a second series was being written.

== Release ==
Visions premiered at Canneseries on 3 April 2023.

It was broadcast in France on TF1 beginning on 16 May 2022, and was also available for streaming on Salto. It was released in Australia on SBS on Demand as Beyond Signs on 28 September 2023.
