= Lupin (French TV series) =

French mystery thriller television series

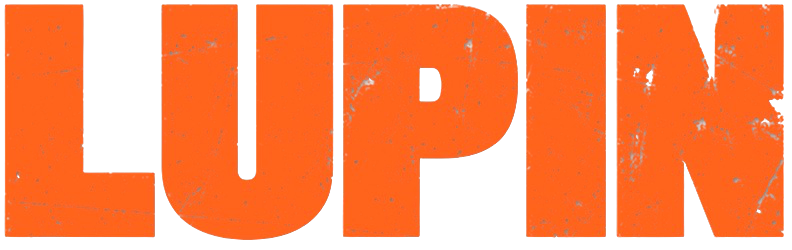
- Genre: Crime drama; Thriller; Mystery
- Created by: George Kay; François Uzan
- Based on: Arsène Lupin by Maurice Leblanc
- Written by: George Kay; François Uzan; Eliane Montane; Soiliho Bodin; Nicolas Clément; Camille Couasse; Sumerah Srivastav; Steve Bailie; Tony Saint; Adam Usden; Kam Odedra
- Directed by: Louis Leterrier; Marcela Said; Ludovic Bernard; Hugo Gélin; Daniel Grou; Xavier Gens
- Starring: Omar Sy; Ludivine Sagnier; Antoine Gouy; Soufiane Guerrab; Shirine Boutella; Etan Simon
- Composer: Mathieu Lamboley
- Country of origin: France
- Original language: French
- No. of seasons: 3 (4 parts) (Note: Some publications refer to "part" as "season".)
- No. of episodes: 25

Production
- Producers: Isabelle Degeorges; Nathan Franck; Martin Jaubert
- Cinematography: Christophe Nuyens; Martial Schmeltz
- Editors: Jean-Daniel Fernandez-Qundez; Richard Marizy; Audrey Simonaud
- Running time: 41–53 minutes
- Production companies: Gaumont Television; Carrousel Studios

Original release
- Network: Netflix
- Release: 8 January 2021 – present

Lupin is a French mystery thriller television series created by George Kay and François Uzan. It premiered on Netflix on 8 January 2021, when the first set of five episodes were released. Another five aired on 11 June 2021. Its third installment debuted on 5 October 2023. The series was renewed for a fourth part, which was released on 23 October 2026.

The show stars Omar Sy in the role of Assane Diop, a man who is inspired by the adventures of master thief Arsène Lupin, a character created by Maurice Leblanc in the early 1900s. The first part, consisting of five episodes, is subtitled Dans l'ombre d'Arsène ("in the shadow of Arsène"), referring to the primary character's inspiration. The series was watched by 76 million households during its first month, becoming the most-watched non-English series on Netflix at the time.

Lupin debuted to critical acclaim, with Sy's performance in the leading role singled out for particular praise. It has received several accolades, winning a Critics' Choice Award for Best Foreign Language Series and being nominated for Best Drama Series at the International Emmy Awards and the Golden Globe Awards.

== Synopsis ==
The story follows professional thief Assane Diop, the only son of an immigrant from Senegal who had come to France to seek a better life for himself and his child. Assane's father is framed for the theft of an expensive diamond necklace by his employer, the wealthy and powerful Hubert Pellegrini, and takes his own life in his prison cell, leaving the fourteen-year-old Assane to fend for himself on the streets of Paris. Twenty-five years later, inspired by a book about gentleman thief Arsène Lupin his father had given him on his birthday, Assane sets out to clear his father's name and get revenge on the Pellegrini family, using his charisma and mastery of thievery, subterfuge, and disguise to expose Pellegrini's crimes.

The second part focuses on the search for Assane's kidnapped son, Raoul, and the plan to take Pellegrini down; the latter was not killed but imprisoned. The third part revolves around the theft of "the priceless Black Pearl" by Assane, and his attempt to mend the relationships with his wife and son. The fourth part involves a hacker posing as Assane less than a week after he is going to be released from prison, as he tried to reconnect with his son, his friend, and ex-wife.

== Cast and characters ==
=== Main ===
- Omar Sy as Assane Diop, a gentleman thief who styles himself after Arsène Lupin and vows to avenge his father's death.
  - Mamadou Haïdara as young Assane Diop
- Ludivine Sagnier as Claire Laurent, Assane's estranged wife and the mother of his child, of whom she has full custody.
  - Ludmilla Makowski as young Claire Laurent
- Antoine Gouy as Benjamin Férel, Assane's best friend from his school days, who currently works as an antiquarian.
  - Adrian Valli de Villebonne (parts 1–3) and Brice Derouéné (part 4) as young Benjamin Férel
- Soufiane Guerrab as Youssef Guédira, a lieutenant detective who uses his knowledge of the Arsène Lupin books to track Assane's activity.
- Shirine Boutella as Sofia Belkacem, a lieutenant detective and colleague of Guédira's. As of part 3, she has been promoted to the rank of captain.
- Clotilde Hesme as Juliette Pellegrini (main, parts 1–2; guest, part 3; recurring, part 4), the daughter of wealthy entrepreneur Hubert Pellegrini.
  - Léa Bonneau as young Juliette Pellegrini
- Nicole Garcia as Anne Pellegrini (parts 1–2), Hubert's wife.
- Hervé Pierre as Hubert Pellegrini (main, parts 1–2; guest, part 3, part 4), an unscrupulous business tycoon who once employed Assane's father, Babakar.
- Vincent Londez as Romain Laugier (parts 1–2), a police captain tasked with retrieving the Pellegrinis' necklace.
- Etan Simon (parts 1–3) and Théo Christine (part 4) as Raoul Diop, the son of Assane and Claire
- Laïka Blanc-Francard (part 4) as Adèle Kapour, a skilled hacker who uses her skills to pose as Arsène Lupin through the use of deep fakes and outfits, then engages in a series of high-profile thefts through France.

=== Supporting ===
- Fargass Assandé as Babakar Diop (parts 1–3, flashback sequences only), Assane's late father, who was falsely accused of having stolen the Pellegrinis' diamond necklace.
- Vincent Garanger as Gabriel Dumont (parts 1–2), the commissioner of the Paris police department.
  - Johann Dionnet as young Gabriel Dumont
- Adama Niane as Léonard Koné (parts 1–2), an ex-convict and assassin employed by Hubert.
- Anne Benoît as Fabienne Bériot (part 1), an unjustly disgraced former journalist who had come close to exposing Hubert's villainy.
- Nicolas Wanczycki as Pascal Oblet (part 2), an undercover police officer who works closely with Hubert.
- Stefan Crepon as Philippe Courbet (parts 2–3), a young stockbroker who is not all he seems.
- Martha Canga Antonio as Fleur Bélanger (part 3), a journalist seeking to uncover the truth about Assane's activities.
- Pierre Lottin as Bruno (part 3), a former childhood friend of Assane's
  - Noé Wodecki as young Bruno
- Steve Tientcheu as Jean-Luc Keller (part 3), a man who ran a boxing club that Assane had joined as a teenager.
  - Salif Cissé [fr] as young Jean-Luc Keller
- Sandra Parfait as Manon (part 3), Keller's girlfriend
  - Sandya Touré Maite as young Manon
- Naky Sy Savané as Mariama Diop (part 3), Assane's mother
  - Seyna Kane as young Mariama Diop
- Vincent Overath as Cisco (part 3), the leader of a gang that Assane becomes involved with.
- Astrid Bas as Korvin (part 4), the police commissioner who secretly works with the Guardians of the Treasure.
- Jonas Bachan as Esteban (part 4), a small-time criminal who is impressed with Raoul's thieving skills.
- Loïc Corbery as Guillaume de Charmerace, one of the three remaining Guardians of the Treasure who once met Assane, when he was younger, and threatened him.
  - Baptiste Masseline as young Guillaume de Charmerace

== Episodes ==
=== Series overview ===
Part	Season	Episodes	Originally released
1	1	5	8 January 2021
2	1	5	11 June 2021
3	2	7	5 October 2023
4	3	8	23 October 2026

=== Part 1 (2021) ===
No. overall	No. in part	Title	Directed by	Written by	Original release date
1	1	"Chapter 1"	Louis Leterrier	George Kay	8 January 2021
Assane Diop plans the theft of an expensive diamond necklace, once owned by Marie Antoinette, which his father Babakar had been accused of stealing from the wealthy Pellegrini family 25 years earlier. He enlists the help of a group of loan sharks, to whom he owes money. Under the alias "Paul Sernine", Assane attends an auction for the necklace, hosted by the Pellegrinis at the Louvre. He makes the winning bid, but the loan sharks, disguised as museum security guards, double-cross him and steal the necklace. However, their getaway goes awry and they are arrested, while Assane ends up in possession of the diamonds and walks free. Later that night, while investigating the case, a police detective named Youssef Guédira notices that it bears a striking resemblance to the stories of Arsène Lupin, and then realizes that "Paul Sernine" is an anagram of Lupin's name. The day after the heist, Assane gives his son, Raoul, a copy of Arsène Lupin, Gentleman Burglar, gifted to him by Babakar, who died in prison by an apparent suicide shortly after being convicted for the original necklace theft.
2	2	"Chapter 2"	Louis Leterrier	George Kay and François Uzan	8 January 2021
Assane's best friend, antiquarian Benjamin Férel, informs him that the queen's necklace was unlikely to ever have been deconstructed after being stolen as had been previously claimed by the Pellegrini family. Assane begins doubting that his father was responsible for the initial theft and confronts Juliette Pellegrini, who acknowledges that her family's story about the necklace's recovery was a lie concocted to drum up publicity, but affirms her belief in Babakar's guilt. Unsatisfied, Assane gets himself placed in jail so that he can speak to Étienne Comet, a man who worked at the prison library during his father's incarceration. A sickly Comet leads Assane to a copy of The Confessions of Arsène Lupin, with annotations from his father spelling out the phrase "I am innocent—framed by Anne Pellegrini". Assane escapes prison and finds Anne, who admits that she had instructed Babakar to sign a false confession at the urging of an Inspector Gabriel Dumont. Assane recognizes Dumont as the police officer who turned him over to social services following Babakar's death. Meanwhile, Guédira continues to investigate the Arsène Lupin connection, happening upon Babakar's case file.
3	3	"Chapter 3"	Louis Leterrier	François Uzan	8 January 2021
After learning that Inspector Dumont was responsible for handling the case against his father, Assane kidnaps the now-Commissioner Dumont from one of Paris's town halls and tries to force him into confessing to having framed Babakar. 25 years earlier, a younger Dumont figures out that Hubert Pellegrini, who had recently had the necklace's insurance policy increased, masterminded its disappearance and set Babakar up to take the fall. When he realizes that Dumont is building a case against him for insurance fraud, Hubert mentions his powerful connections and threatens to have the police officer's wife harmed, which convinces Dumont to trick Anne into getting Babakar to sign the confession. In the present, Dumont maintains that he legitimately believed Babakar was guilty, although Assane manages to get him to admit to having accepted bribes from criminals in order to pad his salary. However, the interrogation grinds to a halt when an enraged Assane accidentally reveals his identity. The police, meanwhile, scramble to locate their commissioner, and Assane escapes just before they can catch him. Dumont is rescued but does not reveal any information about the identity of his kidnapper. Later, Guédira discovers Dumont's involvement with the original investigation and connects it to the necklace's theft and the abduction.
4	4	"Chapter 4"	Marcela Said	George Kay, François Uzan, Eliane Montane	8 January 2021
Assane finds Dumont again and coerces him into providing more information about Hubert Pellegrini. Dumont gives him the name of Fabienne Bériot, a former investigative journalist who was sued for defamation by Hubert after she publicly denounced his corruption in a book titled Dirty Money: The Pellegrini System. Fabienne agrees to team up with Assane and helps him acquire a tape connecting the entrepreneur's arms dealing to a deadly terrorist attack on a French embassy in Kuala Lumpur. Under the alias "Salvator813", Assane posts an image from the tape on Twitter, threatening to release the full video. Hubert publicly denies the allegations, and his henchman Léonard Koné begins stalking Fabienne. Meanwhile, Guédira is removed from the necklace investigation by Dumont, who realizes the detective is closing in on the truth about his involvement in the original case. A heavily disguised Assane's plan to expose Hubert on the talk show The Other Edition fails when Hubert, who is friends with the show's host, manages to have the footage altered. Juliette, now convinced of her father's innocence, reveals to him that Assane is behind the accusations, as well as the Louvre heist. Léonard attacks Fabienne in her home and demands to know where Assane lives, but Fabienne refuses to give him the information. To his horror, Assane returns to discover her body hanging from the ceiling.
5	5	"Chapter 5"	Marcela Said	George Kay and François Uzan	8 January 2021
Following Fabienne's death, Assane gives her dog, J'accuse, to Benjamin. On Raoul's birthday, Assane surprises him with a top hat and cape and takes him and Claire on a train trip to a Lupin-themed festival in Étretat. Léonard, who has begun pursuing Assane, follows the family onto the train, with orders from Hubert to get rid of Assane but to leave Claire and Raoul alone. Assane spots Léonard and fights him in a storage closet at the back of the train, managing to lock him inside. As the train pulls into its destination, however, Léonard escapes the closet and sits beside Raoul. In an attempt to manage the situation, Assane instructs his family to disembark ahead of him and manipulates the local police into arresting Léonard by suggesting that he is Paul Sernine. After Assane catches up, the family makes it to the festival without incident. While Raoul explores the beach by himself, a concerned Claire questions Assane about Léonard but grows distressed when he avoids telling her the truth. Assane promises that he will stop hiding things from her in the future and asks her for one more chance to prove himself. Léonard, meanwhile, is released from police custody and kidnaps Raoul. Claire becomes worried upon noticing that she cannot see Raoul on the beach, and she and Assane begin a fruitless search for him. Guédira appears and calls out to Assane, addressing him quizzically as "Lupin".

=== Part 2 (2021) ===
No. overall	No. in part	Title	Directed by	Written by	Original release date
6	1	"Chapter 6"	Ludovic Bernard	George Kay and François Uzan	11 June 2021
Guédira informs Assane and Claire that he saw Raoul struggling with Léonard in a parking lot, and that the two drove away. Claire is horrified and blames Assane for the kidnapping; Assane unsuccessfully tries to reassure her that he will bring Raoul back to her safely. Guédira, aware that Assane is the man he is searching for, offers to help him track Léonard down, and the two steal a car and give chase. Remaining in Étretat, Claire contacts the local police but is upset by the lack of urgency in their response and returns to Paris, intending to seek help from Benjamin. Meanwhile, Assane and Guédira locate Léonard in the town of Bourneville and tail him to an abandoned mansion, where Léonard, who has Raoul bound and gagged, is lying in wait. Guédira quietly contacts Sofia Belkacem and asks her for assistance, but Assane ties him up inside the car after revealing that he knows that Guédira is a police officer. Assane enters the house, fights Léonard, and throws him out of a window. However, Léonard, who has locked Raoul in the boot of his car, manages to stand up, douses the car in gasoline, and sets it alight. When he sees the burning vehicle and realizes what has happened, Assane is devastated and breaks down. A moment later, Belkacem appears and arrests him.
7	2	"Chapter 7"	Ludovic Bernard	George Kay, Soiliho Bodin, Nicolas Clément	11 June 2021
Prior to Belkacem's arrival, Guédira escapes his bindings and successfully rescues Raoul from Léonard's car without Assane's knowledge. Afterwards, he is informed that Dumont wants Raoul taken to the Park Hyatt hotel in central Paris, where Hubert and Juliette are hosting an event in honor of their foundation. Although confused, Guédira complies with the order. Hubert and Dumont hold Raoul hostage at the hotel, expecting Assane to walk into their trap. Assane, meanwhile, is extremely relieved when Belkacem tells him that nothing but a soda can was found in the boot of the car. He escapes police custody, steals another car, and drives to Paris, where he uses voice-altering technology to make himself sound like Hubert in order to successfully rescue Raoul from his captors. Unbeknownst to Assane, Claire has uncovered the truth of his activities after happening upon an image of his disguised appearance on The Other Edition. She confirms her fears with Benjamin and, desperate with worry for her son's safety, attempts to negotiate his release with Hubert directly, but Hubert forces her to betray Assane in exchange. When Assane brings Raoul back home, a number of Hubert's associates, led by Pascal Oblet, await him there. However, after Claire begs Pascal for a moment alone with Raoul, she manages to tell Assane to run away.
8	3	"Chapter 8"	Hugo Gélin	George Kay and Camille Couasse	11 June 2021
Assane escapes from Pascal and his men and hides in the roof above Claire's apartment, where, to his dismay, he hears Claire tearfully telling Raoul that Assane is dangerous, and that she doesn't want him to come near them again. Having once again failed to ensnare Assane, Hubert makes plans for an upcoming charity concert for Juliette's foundation with a young stockbroker named Philippe Courbet, revealing that he intends to send 85% of the donations brought in during the event to a personal offshore bank account in the Cayman Islands. Meanwhile, Assane and Benjamin come up with an elaborate plan to weaken Hubert that involves Assane seducing Juliette by taking her on a joyride around Paris and pretending to steal a priceless Pissaro painting for her. The plan goes without a hitch, as Assane manipulates Juliette into talking to her mother about Hubert's crimes during the 1990s. When Juliette visits her, Anne admits that the necklace theft was an insurance scam, and that Hubert had hired Babakar with the intention of framing him for it. Juliette is shocked and urges Anne to denounce Hubert to the police. After learning the truth from Anne, Guédira and Captain Laugier arrest Hubert while he is meeting with Courbet.
9	4	"Chapter 9"	Hugo Gélin	George Kay and Steve Bailie	11 June 2021
Laugier and Belkacem interrogate Hubert, who is uncooperative but does reveal Assane's real name. The police are ultimately forced to let Hubert go after he calls in a favor from the minister of the interior. Pascal discovers that Benjamin is Assane's accomplice and informs Hubert, who instructs Léonard to tail Benjamin in order to find out where Assane lives. Hubert also secretly arranges for Pascal to murder Léonard in Assane's apartment and to frame Assane for the crime. Their scheme is a success, and when Assane discovers what has happened and realizes that the police are on their way, he goes on the run and tells Benjamin to do the same. That night, Assane's identity is publicly revealed, and he immediately becomes the most notorious criminal in France. Over the next few days, Assane and Benjamin hide out, managing to evade capture using a secret bunker that connects to the Catacombs of Paris. Meanwhile, after finding a coded message from Assane, Guédira recovers a USB drive among the evidence taken from the apartment that contains footage of Dumont's interrogation, in which he admits to his having accepted illegal bribes, as well as more papers that link him to Babakar's case.
10	5	"Chapter 10"	Hugo Gélin	George Kay and Sumerah Srivastav	11 June 2021
Belkacem receives evidence from the police laboratory suggesting that Assane was not Léonard's murderer. Guédira informs her and Laugier about Dumont's corruption, and the three resolve to arrest him at the Pellegrinis' concert at the Théâtre du Châtelet that evening. Assane is smuggled into the theater with assistance from a disguised Benjamin and Philippe Courbet, actually an accomplice of Assane and Benjamin whom they had found attempting to steal Arsène Lupin books. When the music starts, Assane sneaks into Hubert's private box, holding him at knifepoint and forcing him to confess to having framed Babakar and orchestrated his murder, as well as the murders of Fabienne and Léonard and the kidnapping of Raoul. Assane is chased extensively through the theater by Hubert's men but manages to get onstage, where he publicly accuses Hubert of all of his crimes, including stealing from the foundation. He succeeds in evading the police by disguising himself as a firefighter, and sends Guédira a recording of Hubert's confession. While Guédira, Laugier, and Belkacem take Hubert and Dumont into custody, Assane steals a speedboat and arranges a reconciliatory meeting with Claire and Raoul on a nearby bridge. He apologizes for the pain his actions have caused them and tells them that he needs to stay away for their safety. As the police approach, he runs off into the night.

=== Part 3 (2023) ===
No. overall	No. in part	Title	Directed by	Written by	Original release date
11	1	"Chapter 1"	Ludovic Bernard	George Kay	5 October 2023
One year after Assane's showdown with Hubert Pellegrini, he lives incognito in Marseille. Assane remains the most wanted man in France and has unintentionally become a folk hero. Claire and Raoul, meanwhile, are tormented by constant media harassment. Assane is furious at their treatment and decides to return to Paris, initially approaching Claire with a plan to spirit her and Raoul out of the country, but Claire is upset with Assane and rebuffs his offer, suggesting that the only way he could truly repay them would be to turn himself in. Undeterred, Assane plots to fund their escape by stealing an expensive black pearl from a luxury boutique located at the Place Vendôme, sending a letter to the shop's owner as well as the staff of the newspaper The Objector, explicitly stating his intentions. A squad led by Belkacem is summoned to the scene, where a large crowd of Assane's supporters is eagerly awaiting the burglary. Although he has not been assigned to the case, Guédira decides to tag along and mingles with the fans. Helped by Benjamin and another childhood friend, Bruno, both disguised as BRI officers, Assane's heist is successful. He escapes across the high roofs surrounding the square but fails to get a foothold on one of his attempts to jump to an adjacent building, and plummets to the streets below.
12	2	"Chapter 2"	Ludovic Bernard and Daniel Grou	George Kay, François Uzan, Tony Saint	5 October 2023
Assane survives his fall, having planned to fake his death using an airbag and a vial of his own blood. His seemingly lifeless body is spirited off in an ambulance by Benjamin and Philippe Courbet before the police can arrive on the scene. Dressed in lab coats, Philippe and Benjamin use a broken stethoscope to successfully manipulate a doctor at the morgue into confirming the death, and the news of Assane's demise breaks shortly after. A funeral is held for him at Père-Lachaise Cemetery, where Guédira, skeptical of the reality of Assane's death, demands that the casket be opened, to the horror of Claire and Raoul. After the event has finished, Assane escapes the casket through a tunnel underneath the cemetery and reunites with Benjamin, who has managed to find a dealer who can get twenty million euros for the pearl. However, Assane's plans are put on hold when he receives a phone call from a woman claiming to be his mother, Mariama, to whom he had last spoken in 1998, when she was serving a prison sentence in Senegal. She pleads with Assane for help, telling him that she has been kidnapped and that her captors are requesting the black pearl as ransom.
13	3	"Chapter 3"	Daniel Grou	George Kay and François Uzan	5 October 2023
Frustrated that his ideas about Assane's connections to Arsène Lupin are still not being taken seriously by his colleagues, Guédira makes a deal with Objector journalist Fleur Bélanger to provide her with his evidence. The resulting story ultimately winds up rekindling public interest in Arsène Lupin. Like Guédira, Raoul is refusing to accept Assane's death, leading Claire to grow worried about his mental state. She gives her phone number to Raoul's new basketball coach, Alex, and asks him to let her know if her son is having any difficulties. Mariama's kidnappers order Assane to steal Chez Tortoni, a painting by Édouard Manet, currently in the illegal possession of a Nanterre-based gang leader named Cisco. In disguise, Assane ingratiates himself with Cisco's gang, managing to gain a position as a getaway driver in a robbery that they are planning. With some help from gadgets designed by Benjamin, Assane double-crosses the gang, leaving them to be arrested by the police, and makes off with the painting, which he gives to Ferdinand, one of the kidnappers, at an arranged rendez-vous point. Having placed a tracking device made by Benjamin onto the painting, Assane impulsively decides to follow Ferdinand to try and locate Mariama.
14	4	"Chapter 4"	Daniel Grou	George Kay and François Uzan	5 October 2023
While at work, Claire is informed that the doctor who examined Assane's body is not in the hospital's database. Beginning to have her own doubts about what happened to Assane, she finds Raoul's written attempts to prove that his father is alive, in which he has highlighted the name of the Arsène Lupin story Edith Swan-Neck. After a semi-incognito trip to the library, Claire acquires the book and, while reading it, stumbles upon the phrase "with Lupin, there's no such thing as death". Meanwhile, Assane is forced by the kidnappers to plan the theft of a bracelet belonging to Tara Xang, wife of real estate magnate Max Moller, both of whom will be appearing at a gala at the Château de Thoiry. In preparation, Assane shows Benjamin how to escape through a hedge maze on the grounds of the château. Assane and Benjamin appear at the gala, posing as footmen. Unbeknownst to Benjamin, the actual price that Mariama's kidnappers had demanded was his own imprisonment. When Assane slips the bracelet from Xang's wrist, he drops it on the ground. As Benjamin leaps to pick it up, he is immediately spotted by Moller, who orders his capture. A panic-stricken Benjamin dashes out of the château into the maze but is horrified to find that a large hedge is blocking the path that had been specified for him. At that moment, Guédira and Belkacem, who had previously been called in by Assane, arrive and arrest him.
15	5	"Chapter 5"	Xavier Gens	George Kay, Adam Usden, François Uzan	5 October 2023
Still suspicious that Assane is alive, Guédira interrogates Benjamin in an attempt to get him to reveal Assane's location, but in spite of Assane's betrayal, Benjamin staunchly refuses to give him up. That afternoon, Guédira is shocked when he discovers Assane sitting in his office. Assane promises that he will allow himself to be arrested if Guédira assists him. Although apprehensive, Guédira accepts the offer. Assane disguises Guédira as a collector of stolen art and instructs him to meet with Manon, another of the kidnappers, and Ferdinand, in order to buy the Manet painting from them. Assane calls Belkacem and tips her off about the trade. As the deal is being done, she arrives and arrests Manon, while Ferdinand manages to escape. Assane tails Ferdinand and discovers that he is an accomplice of Jean-Luc Keller, a man whose boxing club Assane had joined as a teenager. Keller had forced Assane and Bruno to take part in a jewellery theft, but he had been the only one arrested for the crime and has carried a vendetta against Assane ever since. Under the guise of granting him an interview, Claire meets with Objector journalist Arnold de Garmeaux, who was present at the morgue when Assane's body was inspected, and asks him to describe the attending doctor to a sketch artist. She is startled when the sketch turns out to be a portrait of Benjamin. Claire visits Benjamin in prison and deceives him into thinking that Assane had confessed everything to her; Benjamin responds by asking what Assane's current plans are. Having received confirmation that Assane is alive, Claire begins to weep with joy.
16	6	"Chapter 6"	Xavier Gens	Kam Odedra, George Kay, François Uzan	5 October 2023
In retaliation for Manon's arrest, Keller orders Ferdinand to kill Claire and Raoul. Claire notices Ferdinand stalking her and manages to evade him, but her worries about future attacks lead her to invite Alex, Raoul's basketball coach, to stay for dinner. Claire has become smitten with Alex due to his softly-spoken bravery and his protectiveness of Raoul. After Raoul has gone to bed, Claire attempts to kiss Alex, but to her dismay, he turns down her advances and leaves after showing her how to set up her alarm system. The following morning, Claire finds a ketchup bottle standing upside-down in the refrigerator, a quirk of Assane's that she had first noticed when they were teenagers, and realizes that Alex is in fact Assane in an elaborate disguise. Meanwhile, Mariama manages to escape captivity and places an advertisement in The Objector, asking Assane to meet her at a metro station. Assane and his mother enjoy a happy reunion. Keller is outraged by the loss of Mariama and Ferdinand's inability to catch Claire, so he throws Ferdinand from a balcony and decides to take care of Assane's family himself. That night, Claire happily lies in bed, with her romantic feelings for Assane fully rekindled, but grows terrified when she hears Keller begin to break down the door of her apartment.
17	7	"Chapter 7"	Xavier Gens	George Kay, Adam Usden, François Uzan	5 October 2023
Claire hides in a closet with Raoul and throws Keller off the trail by making a call to her home phone, in which she implies that neither she nor Raoul are there and that a police officer will be visiting. Afterwards, she calls Assane and begs him to pick her and Raoul up. Assane brings Claire and Raoul to his hideout, where they meet Mariama; he promises that he will get all of them out of Paris. Assane and Mariama infiltrate the offices of the minister for the interior and steal his phone. After threatening to send the contents of the phone to the press, Assane orders the minister to let Manon out of prison. Assane finds Manon and asks her to help him catch Keller. Although initially reluctant, she has a change of heart when Assane explains Keller's manipulative behaviour. Manon calls Keller and tells him that she has found a buyer for the black pearl at the Arc de Triomphe. When Keller arrives for the rendez-vous, he finds only Assane, who has called the police. Keller realizes that he has been set up and tries to run, but he is captured. Making good on his earlier promise, Assane allows Guédira to arrest him, on the condition that Benjamin be set free. Claire arrives at the train station the following morning with Raoul and Mariama in tow, eagerly awaiting Assane's arrival. However, it is Benjamin who turns up, carrying a letter from Assane in which he explains his actions and assures a heartbroken Claire how much he loves her. Assane settles into life in jail but is shocked when he receives an envelope from a neighbouring inmate containing a photograph of Assane as a teenager holding an Arsène Lupin book, Cagliostro's Revenge. The fellow prisoner turns out to be Hubert Pellegrini.

=== Part 4 (2026) ===
No. overall	No. in part	Title	Directed by	Written by	Original release date
18	1	"Chapter 1"	Edouard Salier	Tigran Rosine & Florent Meyer; In collaboration with Mathilde Arnaud & Jean-Yves Arnaud	23 October 2026
Early on in his prison sentence, Assane helps Hubert escape, only to send him to face punishment for his crimes in Malaysia. Three years later, Assane has only one week left of his sentence, after which he plans to move on from his life of crime, having promised to take Raoul on a trip to Senegal. Unbeknownst to him, Benjamin and Claire have begun a relationship. A copycat impersonating Assane hacks masses of screens across Paris to announce two simultaneous robberies in Paris and Avignon, all while Assane is still imprisoned. The copycat creates the illusion of Assane disappearing from his cell during the robberies, and successfully steals a precious sapphire. Guédira and Belkacem are assigned to the Paris robbery, during which Belkacem is pushed from a balcony while threatening to shoot the copycat, and ends up in a coma as a result of her injuries. Although Assane claims his innocence, Guédira retrieves deepfake footage of Assane during the robberies, which prolongs his sentence leaving Raoul disheartened. Having no other choice to regain his freedom and innocence, Assane breaks out of prison. Confronting Juliette, he learns that she is refusing to pay to release her father, now in prison in Malaysia. The copycat locates Assane via drone and taunts him; Assane vows to end their game.
19	2	"Chapter 2"	Edouard Salier	Mathilde Arnaud & Jean-Yves Arnaud; In collaboration with Tigran Rosine & Florent Meyer	23 October 2026
Assane returns to Benjamin's antique shop, but hides when he sees him arriving with Claire. He is distressed when he witnesses the two kissing, but does not confront them. After Claire leaves, Benjamin is surprised to see Assane at the shop, but agrees to help him. They discover that the copycat is Adèle Kapoor, a British citizen involved in several high-profile thefts who had supposedly died years earlier. Assane tracks down Adèle, who reveals her plan to gather the treasure of the Four Kings of France, requiring four specific jewels and a crown, before escaping. Locating Louis XVI’s ruby at the Eiffel Tower, Assane and Benjamin infiltrate the ongoing event. Adèle interferes with their attempts to stop her, having previously sent Claire an invitation to the event under Benjamin's name. Benjamin is horrified when he sees Claire arriving but goes to collect her; the two subsequently become trapped in a hijacked elevator cabin being controlled by Adèle. Assane chooses to save them, though he manages to trick Adèle into being photographed by instant cameras while stealing the ruby. Adèle flies off the tower using a concealed wingsuit and joins her recruiter, Juliette.
20	3	"Chapter 3"	Edouard Salier	Mathilde Arnaud & Jean-Yves Arnaud; In collaboration with Tigran Rosine & Florent Meyer	23 October 2026
Raoul, who has grown increasingly troubled since the copycat heists, is arrested for vandalising a storefront and assaulting a police officer. While in prison he meets a young miscreant named Esteban. Guédira promises Raoul’s freedom if Assane assists in stopping Adèle, and Assane agrees to help. Deducing that Adèle used Assane's contact Wagner, Assane poses as a lawyer to gain information from him by staging a police station escape with help from Guédira. The plan is successful, and Wagner reveals that Adèle plans to steal Francis I of France's diamond during its transfer to a museum. Assane takes the place of the motorcyclist holding the diamond. A pursuit ensues through the subways, where Adèle is arrested, with the diamond held safely. As promised, Raoul is released and reunites with Claire. However, Assane receives a call from Juliette, who tells him that Adèle is their biological daughter, the result of a teenaged hookup at a party in 2000.
21	4	"Chapter 4"	Everardo Gout	Tigran Rosine & Florent Meyer; In collaboration with Mathilde Arnaud & Jean-Yves Arnaud	23 October 2026
Assane visits Juliette, who reveals that Hubert had Adèle sent to an orphanage in England immediately after her birth, and that she had learned of her parentage and tracked down Juliette a year earlier. She tells Assane that she and Adèle are currently being targeted by the "Guardians" for having evidence of the French treasure. Assane contacts Adèle to help her escape extradition to the United Kingdom. This forces him to cancel his planned trip with Raoul to Dakar, which he avoids by presenting a supposedly outdated false passport to the airport staff. Assane instead brings Raoul to a ballet, where Guédira is tricked into intervening in order to leave Adèle during her prison transfer. With Benjamin disguised as a jogging instructor, he disguises Adèle as an elderly jogger, allowing her to escape and join Assane. Juliette joins them, and reveals the real diamond as the subway pursuit was also staged. However, at the Pellegrini residence, Juliette's car explodes, forcing Assane and Adèle to flee. Belkacem regains consciousness and recalls that Adèle was not her attacker. Raoul, meanwhile, locates Assane's real, valid passport among his belongings, and is deeply hurt.
22	5	"Chapter 5"	Everardo Gout	Mathilde Arnaud & Jean-Yves Arnaud; In collaboration with Tigran Rosine & Florent Meyer	23 October 2026
After the attack on Juliette, Assane and Adèle are confronted by the unknown assailant seeking retribution for Adèle having stolen from them. Wishing to gain the treasure to avenge Juliette, Assane helps Adèle track down the crown. Guédira eavesdrops on his boss Korvin and discovers she is working for the Guardians, who plan kill Assane and Adèle. Assane and Adèle successfully retrieve the crown from the Hôtel des Invalides by creating chaos with several costumed lookalikes in Napoleonic uniforms. Realising the danger of arresting Assane and Adèle, Guédira lets them escape. Meanwhile, Raoul joins Esteban's gang and uses his inherited lock-picking skills to steal cars. His stash of money is found in his closet by Claire, who has grown increasingly worried about his behavior. She calls Assane in to talk to him; Raoul expresses his wishes to follow in his father's footsteps and to work with him, but Assane refuses to entertain the idea. Adèle returns to Juliette’s residence where the Guardians' henchmen pursue her. Assane rescues her and fights the henchmen, only to be tasered and knocked out.
23	6	"Chapter 6"	Everardo Gout	Tigran Rosine & Florent Meyer; In collaboration with Mathilde Arnaud & Jean-Yves Arnaud	23 October 2026
Assane is interrogated by Guardian Guillaume de Charmerace, an aristocrat whom Assane had stolen from in his youth. As he is about to be drugged with a truth serum, Assane escapes and finds an alive and captive Juliette, whose kidnapping was disguised by the explosion. They eavesdrop on Charmerace's plan to kill Assane and Adèle. Faking his captivity, Assane meets Adèle in an exchange for the crown; Charmerace retrieves the crown and seemingly shoots the pair to their deaths, but they survive thanks to hidden silverware. Benjamin and Juliette subsequently arrive to collect them. While the four drive back to Paris, Assane confronts Benjamin about his relationship with Claire; Benjamin admits that he had been in love with Claire ever since they all met as teenagers. Assane is dismayed by this revelation, and the two part coldly when the trip is finished. Assane, Adèle and Juliette are in possession of the crown, since Benjamin had used Charmerace's absence to create a hologram to replace it, and use it to reveal the location of the treasure, which becomes a moment of bonding for them. Unbeknownst to them, they are followed by Raoul, who witnesses the scene and grows even more disillusioned about his father.
24	7	"Chapter 7"	Hugo Gélin	Pennda Ba & Mathilde Arnaud & Jean-Yves Arnaud; In collaboration with Tigran Rosine & Florent Meyer	23 October 2026
Decades earlier, Assane and Juliette had found the location of the treasure underneath Paris’ police headquarters, but Hubert had forced Juliette to abandon the search. Alongside Adèle they return to finish the job. Assane and Adèle infiltrate the headquarters and create an elaborate illusion inside Korvin’s office to reach the treasure room. However, their victory is short-lived when the hologram dies out, and armed police confront the pair. They escape, but Adèle is grazed by a stray bullet. Assane and Juliette bring Adèle to the apartment shared by Claire and Benjamin, since Claire is a trained first aid provider. Claire is shocked by the revelation that Adèle is Assane's child, but agrees to help, and treats Adèle's wounds. Shortly afterwards Korvin’s henchmen arrive to search the apartment; Claire and Benjamin successfully distract them and get them to leave. Claire reveals that she had always known about Assane's affairs with Juliette, and admits that she was the reason Hubert had found out about their fling in 2000, as she had snuck into the Pellegrini manor with a note telling Juliette to stay away from Assane, only to be cornered by Hubert. Assane, Claire, Benjamin, and Juliette all forgive each other for their prior mistakes. Assane is eager to see Raoul, but Claire tells him that he has left for Dakar on his own. Meanwhile, Belkacem and Guédira trace footsteps left at the museum to a black-market shoe vendor, and based on CCTV footage deduce Raoul was the one who pushed Belkacem from the balcony.
25	8	"Chapter 8"	Hugo Gélin	Tigran Rosine & Florent Meyer; In collaboration with Mathilde Arnaud & Jean-Yves Arnaud	23 October 2026
Raoul returns and reveals that he was Belkacem's assailant, pushing her as she was about to shoot, as he believed that the copycat was really Assane. Fearing that Korvin will use Raoul’s arrest to threaten him, Assane convinces Guédira to spare his son until he has stolen the treasure. Assane and Benjamin infiltrate dams on the Seine to start a flood, leaving the treasure room unprotected. Charmerace and the other Guardians have the treasure moved away to preserve it. Juliette disguises herself as Korvin to gain control of the truck containing the treasure, while Assane distracts the police on horseback. Having packed a bag for Raoul, Claire meets up with Assane, Benjamin and Juliette at an arranged checkpoint, where the four celebrate the success of the theft. However, they receive a video call from Hubert, who tells Assane that he has kidnapped Adèle and Raoul and forces him to deliver the treasure to him at a Lupin-coded location. Assane leaves the other three behind despite their pleading to come along and drives to the Parc de Saint-Cloud, where he discovers that it was Raoul who had freed Hubert from captivity. Raoul informs Assane that he went to Malaysia rather than Dakar, seeking answers about Adèle's identity and Assane's dalliances with Juliette. He berates Assane for his neglect of him and his mother, demonstrating that a bomb has been placed on Adèle, who is bound and gagged. Assane is horrified and rushes to help Adèle, but the bomb is fake; Raoul reveals that it was intended as a test of how well Assane knew him. He turns to leave in a helicopter with Hubert, at which point Claire, Benjamin, and Juliette, having contacted Guédira to help them decode Hubert's location, arrive with him and Belkacem. When she sees Raoul departing with Hubert, Belkacem fires her gun at him, but Assane jumps into the line of fire and the bullet hits his chest. He falls unconscious as Claire, Juliette, and Benjamin rush to his aid. From the departing helicopter, Raoul watches the scene on the ground indifferently.

== Production ==
=== Development ===
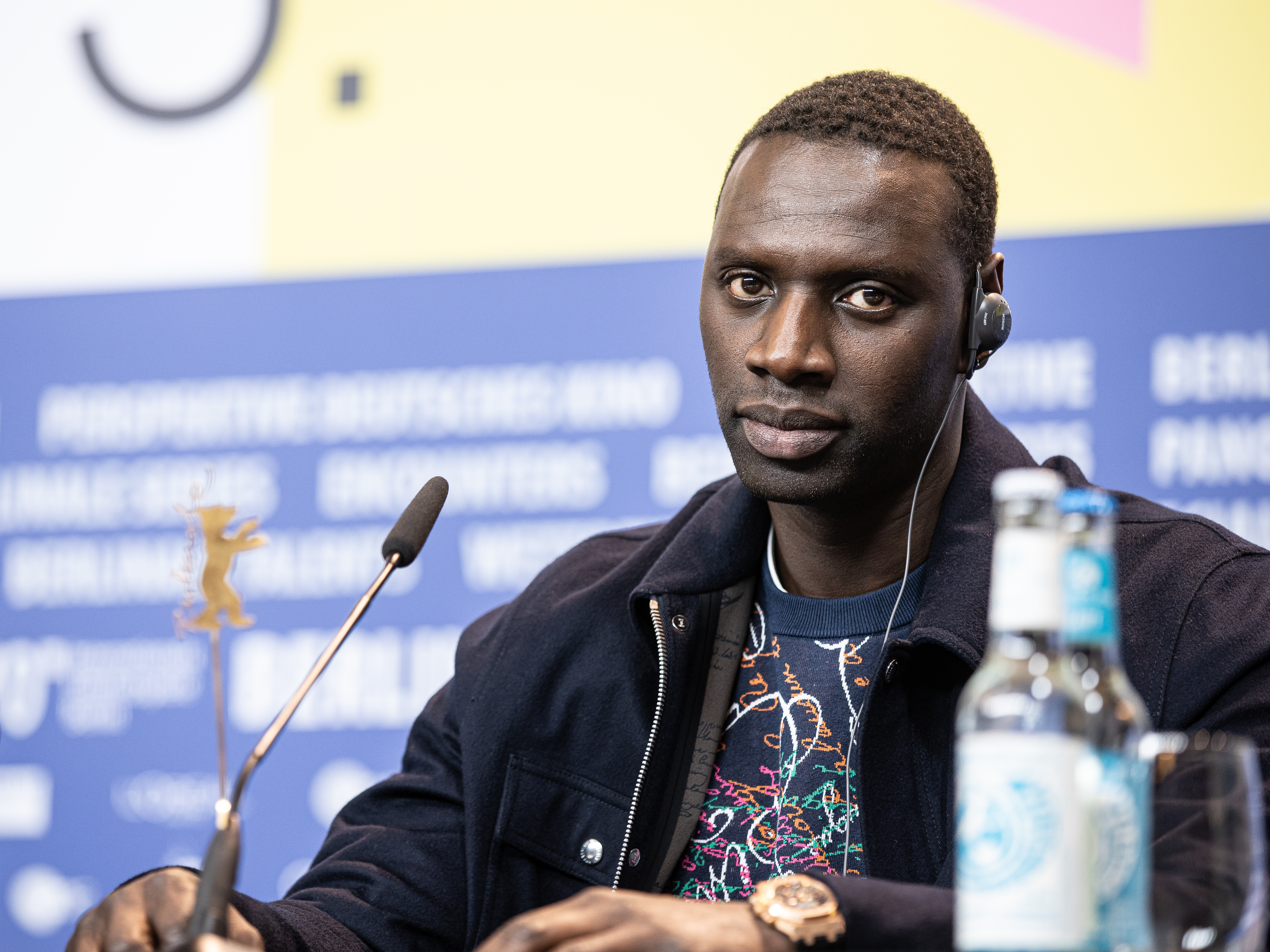
Omar Sy (pictured above in 2020) stars as Assane Diop

On 19 July 2018, Netflix ordered a new series, to be produced by Gaumont, about the character Arsène Lupin, portrayed by Omar Sy. In a 2018 interview, Sy revealed that "Arsene Lupin, who is an iconic and charismatic character, will take on a new life in this modern adaptation, unique in its genre". Netflix confirmed that George Kay and François Uzan would be the showrunners, with Louis Leterrier directing the first three episodes.

Initially, it was planned that Sy would appear as Arsène Lupin himself. However, upon being brought in as the series' showrunner and main writer, George Kay proposed that Sy should instead play a newly created character: Assane Diop, the son of a Senegalese chauffeur, who decides to style himself after the gentleman thief upon discovering Maurice Leblanc's books as a teenager in the 1990s. This allowed the series to explore modern-day cultural and racial issues in France. Sy commented that "the character had to be a Frenchman from today. That's why we have a black guy of African descent, living in the projects. It's a new face of France." Kay described the notion of "good arrogance" as being integral to his conception of Assane's personality: "It's arrogance you don't object to; you just admire [it]. It's: 'I'm going to literally take all your life savings. But if I do it with a big enough smile on my face, you kind of don't mind.'" Sy identified with Kay's characterization of Assane, stating that "my mom's a cleaner. My dad used to work in a factory. Coming from where I come from, I had to be arrogant [...] To be accepted, sometimes you have to pretend. The good arrogance helps you."

Kay was also keen to emphasize how Assane's lifestyle affects his relationships with his estranged wife, Claire, and their son, Raoul: "They're fundamental to the whole being of Assane Diop. He has to work that out, because that's a permanent situation. He has the mother of his child and his child—that's never going to change." The dynamic between Assane and Claire differs substantially from the depictions of women in the series' source material, with Kay noting that the original Arsène Lupin was "ludicrously successful with women in a very sort of disposable way, which probably felt at the time quite fun but now feels really dated. I don't want to write that guy, I want to write a guy who's amazing at breaking into a museum but also can't work out how to explain certain things to his kid or ex-partner." In an interview with the French publication 20 Minutes, Ludivine Sagnier voiced her appreciation for the fact that although Claire continues to care deeply about Assane, she is able to remain true to herself and her desires.

On developing the character of Youssef Guédira, a fellow Lupin devotee who happens to be a police detective charged with hunting Assane down, Kay said that "a lot of our favourite shows have their own podcasts and fanbases and all of that stuff, and I thought it'd be cool if that was incorporated into the series itself, so it becomes like a 'live' adaptation within the series. It takes someone who knows Lupin to recognize he's here at all, and then to start exploring that as an idea felt quite fun because you can back-reference stuff, you can lay a load of breadcrumbs that relate to the books and bring those back in again." Kay commented further on the series' depiction of the French police force, specifically Guédira's immediate superiors, captain Romain Laugier and lieutenant Sofia Belkacem: "It's not that they can't get Assane, it's just that they can't agree on how best to do it in the context of their own hierarchy, so that makes them more rounded as characters."

=== Filming ===
Filming of the first five episodes was completed primarily in Paris, on various streets and at the Louvre, both inside and out. According to research by Condé Nast Traveler, other important locations included La Naumachie pond at Parc Monceau and Musée Nissim de Camondo on rue de Monceau; the latter stands in as the Pellegrini home and is open to the public. Other listed locations include Collège-lycée Jacques-Decour, a parking garage on Rue d'Abbeville, the Marché Biron flea market, the Jardin du Luxembourg, the Pont des Arts, L'Appartement Saint-Martin (near Porte Saint-Martin), and the Maison d'Arrêt de Bois-d'Arcy prison. The publication adds that parts of the fifth episode were filmed in the town of Étretat, which is located along the coast of Normandy. This location is significant because Maurice Leblanc, who created the character Arsène Lupin, lived in the municipality.

The second set of five episodes were already filmed by the end of 2020 and were released on 11 June 2021.

On 18 November 2021, Netflix and Omar Sy confirmed that filming was underway in Paris for the series' third part. Shooting continued into 2022. On 25 February, production was temporarily halted after €300,000 worth of equipment was stolen from the set, resuming three days later. Many of the exteriors were filmed at Place Vendôme, while scenes set at the Hôtel de Beauvau were filmed at the Italian embassy in Paris. A teaser trailer for the show's third part was released during Netflix's Tudum event in September 2022. On 20 April 2023, Netflix announced that part 3 would premiere on the platform on 5 October of that year and that it would consist of seven episodes, with Ludovic Bernard, Daniel Grou, and Xavier Gens directing.

On 12 May 2025, Netflix announced that filming for the show's eight-episode fourth instalment had begun, with Sy, Ludivine Sagnier, Antoine Gouy, Soufiane Guerrab, and Shirine Boutella all reprising their roles, alongside newcomers Théo Christine and Laïka Blanc-Francard, and with Edouard Salier, Everardo Gout, and Hugo Gélin directing. Production wrapped on 16 September 2025.

=== Music ===
The series' music is composed by Mathieu Lamboley, who also appears briefly in the finale of part 2 as the orchestra conductor at the Pellegrinis' concert. On writing the score, Lamboley commented: "To me, Lupin is all about heritage, a father passing on a literary heritage to his son, and the latter continuing the legacy in the present time. The question then became, how do I translate this in music? I decided to take a hybrid approach and mix my classical heritage with more modern sounds [...] and this is what you can hear in the soundtrack: classical writing blended together with hip hop beats."

Lupin (Music from Part 1 of the Netflix Original Series)

Soundtrack album by Mathieu Lamboley
- Released: 8 January 2021
- Genre: Orchestral
- Length: 34:00
- Label: Maisie Music Publishing

Lupin (Music from Part 1 of the Netflix Original Series)
No.	Title	Length
1.	"Arsène"	2:27
2.	"Pellegrini"	1:52
3.	"Juliette"	1:24
4.	"Étretat"	1:27
5.	"L'Emeraude"	3:13
6.	"L'Aiguille Mystérieuse"	2:00
7.	"Gentleman"	2:07
8.	"Cambrioleur"	1:18
9.	"Les Confidences d'Assane"	3:02
10.	"Coffre-fort"	2:38
11.	"Claire"	1:46
12.	"Le Voyageur"	1:47
13.	"Diamants"	1:37
14.	"Louvre"	3:11
15.	"Lupin"	3:52
Total length:		34:00

Lupin (Music from Part 2 of the Netflix Original Series)

Soundtrack album by Mathieu Lamboley
- Released: 11 June 2021
- Genre: Orchestral
- Length: 35:52
- Label: Maisie Music Publishing

Lupin (Music from Part 2 of the Netflix Original Series)
No.	Title	Length
1.	"Le Secret"	3:51
2.	"Coulisses"	1:53
3.	"L'Indice"	1:23
4.	"Agent Ferel & Cie"	1:20
5.	"Le Manoir Mystérieux"	3:34
6.	"Léonard"	1:50
7.	"En Scène!"	1:43
8.	"Duel"	2:30
9.	"Sueur Froide"	2:18
10.	"L'Arnaque"	2:00
11.	"Les Huit Coups"	2:41
12.	"Les Milliards"	3:21
13.	"La Symphonie de Lupin"	5:12
14.	"Dans L'Ombre d'Assane"	2:12
Total length:		35:52

Lupin (Music from Part 3 of the Netflix Original Series)

Soundtrack album by Mathieu Lamboley
- Released: 29 September 2023
- Genres: Orchestral; rock; electronic
- Length: 55:15
- Label: Netflix Music LLC

Lupin (Music from Part 3 of the Netflix Original Series)
No.	Title	Length
1.	"Perle Noire"	2:54
2.	"Carte Postale"	3:38
3.	"Place Vendôme"	7:08
4.	"Inspecteur Ganimard"	1:54
5.	"Labyrinthe"	5:13
6.	"Père-Lachaise"	3:58
7.	"Le Fugitif"	2:55
8.	"Fleur"	1:10
9.	"La Rançon"	2:51
10.	"Ferel"	1:44
11.	"Kidnapping"	3:44
12.	"Filature"	2:22
13.	"Les Huits Coups Variation & Remix"	2:00
14.	"Etretat Variation & Remix"	2:18
15.	"Ave Maria"	2:20
16.	"La Symphonie de Lupin – Version 2"	8:57
Total length:		55:15

Lupin (Music from Part 4 of the Netflix Original Series)

Soundtrack album by Mathieu Lamboley
- Released: 23 October 2026
- Genre: Orchestral
- Length: 53:03
- Label: Netflix Music LLC

Lupin (Music from Part 4 of the Netflix Original Series)
No.	Title	Length
1.	"Lupin Is Back"	2:00
2.	"Adèle"	3:30
3.	"Tour Eiffel"	4:15
4.	"Révélations"	3:43
5.	"La Couronne"	3:56
6.	"La Cage"	2:03
7.	"Les Gardiens du Trésor, Part I"	3:14
8.	"Les Gardiens du Trésor, Part II"	2:48
9.	"Les Gardiens du Trésor, Part III"	1:46
10.	"Champs Élysées"	2:02
11.	"Le Trésor"	1:58
12.	"Trahison"	2:08
13.	"Copycat"	1:46
14.	"Haute Voltige"	1:47
15.	"Lien de Sang"	2:10
16.	"Chez Charmerace"	1:48
17.	"Rémanence"	2:50
18.	"L'Arc de Triomphe"	3:32
19.	"Inspecteur Ganimard (Extended Version)"	2:59
20.	"Parc de Saint-Cloud"	2:51
Total length:		53:03

== Reception ==
=== Viewership ===
Lupin is the first French series to rank among the top ten on Netflix in the United States, reaching number three on 10 January 2021. It was ranked number one in France and many other countries in Europe, including Germany, Austria, Italy, Spain, Denmark, and Sweden, as well as other countries such as Canada, Brazil, Argentina, and South Africa.

As of 31 January 2021, the show was watched by 76 million households, making it the second-most-successful debut ever for an original Netflix show, after Bridgerton. In April, Netflix revealed that Lupin was the most watched title on the company's streaming service in the first quarter of 2021.

On 21 July 2021, it was reported that 54 million households watched the second part of the show, a drop compared to the first installment. Lupin still managed to become one of the biggest shows during the second quarter of 2021.

Between the release of part 2 in June 2021 and part 3 in October 2023, Netflix altered its methods for calculating a series' success, dividing the number of hours it was viewed by its total length for an estimation of total completed viewings. In its first four days on the platform, part 3 of Lupin was viewed approximately 11.6 million times, topping the international (non-English-language) television chart and becoming the strongest launch for a new season of an international show since 2021. Part 3 reached number one in many countries in Europe and Latin America and hit number two in the United States on 9 October, and again on 11 October. By January 2024, part 3 had received 50 million completed viewings.

Lupin is one of the most successful Netflix series in a language other than English, with all three parts achieving placements on the streamer's international top ten. In a press release published in October 2023, Netflix described the show's first two parts as "mainstays on the Most Popular Non-English TV list".

=== Critical response ===
Critical response of Lupin
Season	Rotten Tomatoes	Metacritic
1	98% (48 reviews)	82 (8 reviews)
2	96% (28 reviews)	80 (7 reviews)
3	100% (17 reviews)	76 (9 reviews)
4	100% (7 reviews)	78 (4 reviews)

==== Season 1 ====
On the review aggregation website Rotten Tomatoes, the first part holds an approval rating of 98%, with an average rating of 7.70/10, based on 48 reviews. The site's critical consensus reads: "Omar Sy effortlessly hits every mark in Lupin, an engrossing espionage thriller that lives up to its source material and then some." On Metacritic, the first part has a score of 82 out of 100, based on eight reviews.

Writing for The New Paper, Jonathan Roberts stated that "if [Lupin] was a film, it would be a contender for the year's best". Daniel D'Addario of Variety wrote that the cliffhanger at the end of the first series "will leave any viewer who's taken the ride eager for more." Rolling Stone's Alan Sepinwall praised Sy's performance, writing that "it all works because [he] is so magnetic and charming that questioning plot logic feels wildly besides the point." Karen Han of Slate wrote that Lupin "doesn't waste a single minute, packing each and every moment full of suspense".

==== Season 2 ====
On Rotten Tomatoes, the second part holds an approval rating of 96%, with an average rating of 8.10/10, based on 28 reviews. The site's critical consensus reads: "Smart, sexy, and stylish, Lupin's highly bingeable second season is perfect summer viewing". On Metacritic, the second part has a score of 80 out of 100 based on seven reviews.

==== Season 3 ====
On Rotten Tomatoes, the third part holds an approval rating of 100%, based on 17 reviews with an average rating of 7.8/10. The site's critical consensus reads: "With a star as charming as Omar Sy, who needs a fresh formula? Lupin's third season sticks to its strengths and remains addictive as ever." On Metacritic, the third part has a score of 76 out of 100, based on nine reviews.

The show's third part received similarly positive reviews, although some critics felt that the new set of episodes suffered due to lower stakes for Assane's character. Nonetheless, Sy's performance was acclaimed once again, with Leila Latif of The Guardian calling him a "born action star". Praise was also given to the expanded roles for the series' supporting cast, particularly Ludivine Sagnier as Claire.

==== Season 4 ====
The fourth part has also received positive reviews. On Rotten Tomatoes, the fourth part holds an approval rating of 100%, with an average rating of 8/10, based on 7 reviews. On Metacritic, the fourth part has a score of 78 out of 100, based on five reviews. Screen Rant's Shealyn Scott wrote, "if Lupin season 4 stays focused on the heart of its narrative, Assane's final outing as the gentleman thief is sure to be a thrilling joyride with enough charm to spare."

=== Cultural impact ===
Lupin has been credited with re-popularizing the character of Arsène Lupin, both in France and internationally. Arsène Lupin, Gentleman Burglar, the first collection of Lupin stories written by Maurice Leblanc, topped the children's literature book charts in France following the release of the series.

The show also boosted tourism in Étretat, featured extensively in the fifth episode, to the point where the town's permanent residents struggled to deal with the influx of visitors.

The 2025 Louvre robbery revived interest in the series, whose first episode was compared to the heist. According to analysts at JustWatch, Lupin gained a 32% increase in search results compared to two days prior to the heist, and a 100% boost in viewership occurred the week following the theft.

=== Awards and nominations ===
Award	Category	Recipient(s)	Result	Ref.
2021 Black Reel Awards for Television	Outstanding Drama Series	George Kay	Nominated	
Television Critics Association Awards	Individual Achievement in Drama	Omar Sy	Nominated	
African-American Film Critics Association Awards	Special Achievement – Best International Production	Lupin	Won	
Edinburgh TV Awards	Best International Drama	Lupin	Won	
Gotham Awards	Outstanding Performance in New Series	Omar Sy	Nominated	
Location Managers Guild International Awards	Outstanding Locations in a Contemporary Television Series	Thomas de Sambi & Valérie Segond	Won	
Rose d'Or Awards	Performance of the Year	Omar Sy	Won	
Satellite Awards	Best Television Series – Drama	Lupin	Nominated	
Satellite Awards	Best Actor in a Drama / Genre Series	Omar Sy	Won	
2022 Critics' Choice Television Awards	Best Foreign Language Series	Lupin	Nominated	
Celebration of Black Cinema and Television	Actor – Television	Omar Sy	Won	
Golden Globe Awards	Best Television Series – Drama	Lupin	Nominated	
Golden Globe Awards	Best Actor in a Television Series – Drama	Omar Sy	Nominated	
American Society of Cinematographers Awards	Motion Picture, Limited Series or Pilot Made for Television	Christopher Nuyens	Nominated	
British Academy Television Awards	Best International Programme	Lupin	Nominated	
National Film Awards UK	Best Actor in a TV Series 2022	Omar Sy	Nominated	
2022 Black Reel Awards for Television	Outstanding Actor, Drama Series	Omar Sy	Nominated	
Hollywood Critics Association TV Awards	Best International Series	Lupin	Nominated	
Kinéo Awards	Best Actress	Ludivine Sagnier	Won	
International Emmy Awards	Best Drama Series	Lupin	Nominated	
2024 Critics' Choice Television Awards	Best Foreign Language Series	Lupin	Won	
2024 Digital Creation Genie Awards (PIDS Enghien)	Best Visual Effects – Series	Thierry Onillon, Rodolphe Chabrier, Bruno Sommier, Floran Royer, Mac Guff	Nominated	
Peabody Awards	Entertainment	Lupin	Nominated	
2024 Black Reel Awards for Television	Outstanding Drama Series	Lupin	Nominated	
2024 Black Reel Awards for Television	Outstanding Lead Performance in a Drama Series	Omar Sy	Nominated	
Dorian TV Awards	Best Non-English Language TV Show	Lupin	Nominated	
