= Enfant de la ville =

Studio album by Grand Corps Malade
- Released: March 31, 2008
- Recorded: September to December 2007
- Genre: Slam
- Label: AZ
- Producer: Jean-Rachid for Anouche Productions; S Petit Nico, Alain Lanty, Gilles Bourgain, Feed Back

Grand Corps Malade chronology
Midi 20 (2006)	Enfant de la ville (2008)	3ème temps (2010)

Enfant de la ville is the second studio album of Grand Corps Malade. It was released on 31 March 2008.

== Track listing ==
1. "Mental"
2. "Je viens de là"
3. "Comme une évidence"
4. "4 saisons"
5. "Pères et mères" (a cappella)
6. "À la recherche" (with Kery James and Oxmo Puccino)
7. "Le blues de l'instituteur"
8. "Rétroviseur"
9. "J'écris à l'oral"
10. "Enfant de la ville"
11. "La nuit"
12. "J'ai pas les mots"
13. "Avec eux"
14. "Underground"
15. "L'appartement" (a cappella)
16. "Du côté chance"

== Personnel and credits ==
Music by:

- S Petit Nico - 1, 2, 3, 11
- Alain Lanty - 4
- Gilles Bourgain - 6
- Yannick Kerzanet - 7
- Feed Back - 7, 9, 10, 13, 14
- Baptiste Charvet - 8
- Alejandro Barcelona - 9
- Stéphane Palcossian - 12
- JB of Diez Records - 16

Musicians

- Violins: Hervé Cavelier, Hélène Corbellari
- Alto : Nathalie Carlucci
- Cello : Florence Hennequin
- Guitar : Guillaume Farlet, Thomas Frémont, Yannick Kerzanet, Stéphane Palcossian
- Bass : Xavier Zoly
- Keyboards/Piano : Elie Chémali, Vahan Mardirossian, Alain Lanty
- Drums : Jean-Baptiste Corto
- Flute : Gilles Bourguain, Vincent Chavagnac
- Accordion : Alejandro Barcelona
- Percussions : Feed Back

Production

- Production : Jean-Rachid for Anouche Productions
- Realisation : Feed Back (Patrick Ferbac)
- Arrangements / directing the orchestra : Gérard Daguerre
- Sound engineer / Mixing : Nico (staf) Stawski
- Mastering : Éric Chevet at Masterdisk Europe
- Photos studio : Jean-Michel Delage
- Photos cover : Stefan Rappo
- Graphics : designppk08

== Charts ==
Chart (2013)	Peak position
Belgian Albums (Ultratop Wallonia)	6
French Albums (SNEP)	2
Swiss Albums (Schweizer Hitparade)	15
