= Patients (film) =

2016 film by Grand Corps Malade

- Directed by: Grand Corps Malade; Mehdi Idir
- Written by: Grand Corps Malade; Fadette Drouard
- Produced by: Éric and Nicolas Altmayer; Jean-Rachid
- Starring: Pablo Pauly; Soufiane Guerrab; Moussa Mansaly; Nailia Harzoune; Franck Falise; Yannick Renier
- Cinematography: Antoine Monod
- Edited by: Laure Gardette
- Production companies: Gaumont; Mandarin Films; Kallouche Cinéma; F. Marc de Lacharrière
- Distributed by: Gaumont
- Release dates: 10 November 2016 (Sarlat Film Festival); 1 March 2017
- Running time: 110 minutes
- Country: France
- Language: French
- Budget: $4.3 million
- Box office: $8.7 million

Patients is a 2016 French drama directed by Grand Corps Malade and Mehdi Idir.

== Plot ==
Following a serious sports accident in a swimming pool, Ben, now an incomplete quadriplegic, arrives in a rehabilitation center. He meets other disabled people (tetraplegics, paraplegics, traumatized crania), all victims of accidents, as well as a disabled since his early childhood. Between impotence, despair and resignation, in the daily struggle to learn to move a finger or to hold a fork, some slowly find a little mobility while others receive the verdict of the disability for life. Despite everything, hope and friendship help them endure their difficulties.

== Cast ==
- Pablo Pauly as Ben
- Soufiane Guerrab as Farid
- Moussa Mansaly as Toussaint
- Nailia Harzoune as Samia
- Franck Falise as Steve
- Yannick Renier as François
- Jason Divengele as Lamine
- Rabah Nait Oufella as Eddy
- Dominique Blanc as Dr. Challes
- Alban Ivanov as Jean-Marie
- Anne Benoît as Christiane
- Côme Levin as Eric
- Samir El Bidadi as Samir
- Tarik Derradji as Mamadou
- Eric Wagner as Max
- Saïd Yosri as Saïd
- Jibril Bentchakal as Djibril
- Adama Bathily as Adama
- Corentin Fila as Basketball player
