= 3ème temps =

Studio album by Grand Corps Malade
- Released: 2010
- Genre: Slam
- Label: AZ

Grand Corps Malade chronology
Enfant de la ville (2008)	3ème temps (2010)	Funambule (2013)

3e temps (pronounced Troisième temps) is the third studio album of Grand Corps Malade. It most notably includes a collaboration by Charles Aznavour, a favorite artist of Fabien Marsaud (Grand Corps Malade).

== Track listing ==
1. "1er janvier 2010" (featuring Frederic Yonnet)
2. "Définitivement"
3. "A l'école de la vie"
4. "Roméo kiffe Juliette"
5. "Éducation Nationale"
6. "J'attends"
7. "Tu es donc j'apprends" (featuring Charles Aznavour)
8. "Un verbe"
9. "Rachid Taxi"
10. "Jour de doute"
11. "Bulletin météo"
12. "A Montréal"
13. "Nos absents"
14. "L'heure d'été" (featuring Elise Oudin-Gilles)

== Charts ==
Chart (2013)	Peak position
Belgian Albums (Ultratop Wallonia)	4
French Albums (SNEP)	3
Swiss Albums (Schweizer Hitparade)	20
