= Abder Isker =

French/Algerian filmmaker

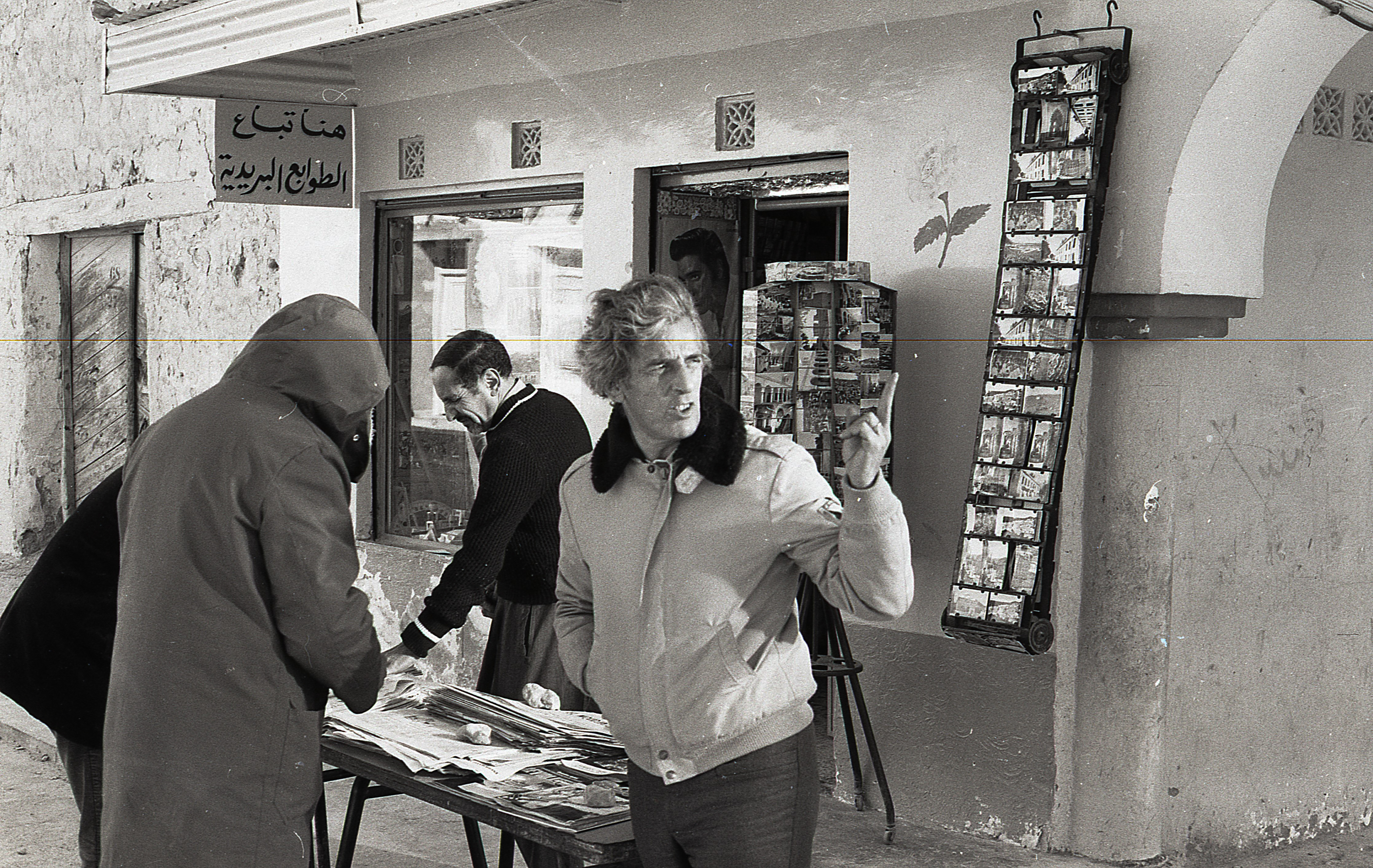
- Born: 11 December 1920
- Died: 14 December 2010 (aged 90)
- Occupations: Film director Screenwriter; Television producer

Abder Isker (born Abderrahmane Isker; 11 December 1920 – 14 December 2010), was a French-Algerian film director, screenwriter, and television producer. He was the first Algerian director whose work was screened on French television, and also produced a radio drama / mystery series.

== Early life and education ==
Abderrahmane Isker was born on 11 December 1920 in the Kabylia region of Algeria.

In the late 1930s, the family lived in Hussein-Dey, Algeria. While studying, Isker played for Olympique Hussein Dey (OHD) football club between 1939 and 1943, with his older brother Nafa. It was at the end of his sporting career, in the early 1950s, that he became passionate about cinema.

He is the great-uncle of filmmaker Akim Isker, whose profession he inspired.

== Career ==
Isker is especially known as a screenwriter, director and producer of series for French television from 1962 to 1994. He was the first Algerian director whose work was screened on French television.

He dedicated his first film to Franco-Muslim friendship.

In the 1970s he shot his television serials and dramas on analog video, rather than film. He created several mystery and detective stories in his TV series during this period, including some based on stories by British crime fiction writer Francis Durbridge, such as A Certain Richard Dorian (Un certain Richard Dorian; 1973; based on A Man Called Harry Brent) and The Passenger (La Passagère (1974; based on The Passenger). The first television serial based on Durbridge's stories, also translated by Isker along with Yves Jamiaque, was L'écharpe (The Scarf) in 1966.

Isker also produced variety shows in the 1970s.

In the 1990s he ran the writing workshop for TF1 for two series of Drôles d'histoires (Funny Stories). From October 1988 to February 1993 he directed a team who wrote and produced two series of Histoires d'amour.

=== Radio ===
Isker produced numerous episodes of Maîtres du mystère (Masters of Mystery) and other stories by blind writer Louis C. Thomas between 1955 and 1960. The 51-episode radio series The Adventures of Arsène Lupin, directed by Abder Isker and based on the work of Maurice Leblanc, was presented by Maurice Renault and Raymond Marcillac as part of the Radio-Magazine du Soir on Paris Inter between 12 May 1960 and 15 July 1961, with the voices of Michel Roux, Louis Ducreux, Robert Marcy, and Yves Brainville.

Between 1958 and 1960, he directed a total of 38 episodes of the series Les Enquêtes de Sherlock Holmes, adapted for radio by Jean Marcillac and presented by Maurice Renault, on Paris Inter.

Along with other North African creatives, Isker had an impact on the popularity of North African music in France.

== Personal life and death ==
Isker retained his Algerian citizenship until at least 1993.

Isker died on 14 December 2010.

== Selected filmography ==
=== As director, TV ===
Some of the TV productions directed by Isker include:

- 1963 – La Dernière Porte (The Last Door)
- 1964 – Le cœur ébloui (The Dazzled Heart)
- 1968 – Provinces
- 1970 – À corps perdu (In Lost Body)
- 1971 – Le temps du rossignol (The Time of the Nightingale)
- 1971 – Mort d'un champion (Death of a Champion)
- 1973 – Le cauchemar de l'aube (The Nightmare of Dawn)
- 1978 – Douze heures pour mourir (Twelve Hours to Die)
