= Akim Isker =

French filmmaker (born 1978)

- Born: 1978 (age 47–48); Algiers, Algeria
- Citizenship: French
- Occupations: Film director Actor
- Years active: 2000-present

Akim Isker (born 1978) is a French film director and actor, the great-nephew of television director and producer Abder Isker. He directed the 2022 supernatural drama Visions.

== Early life and education ==
Akim Isker was born in Algiers in 1978, the youngest of three boys. When he was four, the family moved to Villeurbanne, near Lyon, before returning to Algeria around 1988. When the 1988 October Riots broke out, the family returned to live with their maternal grandparents, who worked in a Renault factory, in Malakoff. The family tried again to return to Algeria, but then settled first in Montrouge and then in Évry when Akim was in his teens.

He attended the Lycée du Parc des Loges (senior high school) in Évry-Courcouronnes, in the southern suburbs of Paris, France, in the 1990s.

From a young age he had admired his great-uncle Abder Isker, the first Algerian director whose work was screened on French television, and the 1976 film Taxi Driver by Martin Scorsese impressed him. He enrolled at university to study film (his parents being unable to afford private film school), but dropped out after finding too much focus on New Wave cinema and fantasy.

== Career ==
After entering the industry "through the back door" as an actor, starring in a number of short films and telemovies between 2000 and 2009, Isker was offered an opportunity to work as assistant director on the 2001 TV series P.J. (Police judiciaire) by Gérard Vergez. Aged only 22, he refused at first, but then accepted and followed Vergez's advice. He served as assistant director in five episodes, and acted in one, P.J., which starred Bruno Wolkowitch (1997–2009), and also served as assistant director for three other films (2000, 2006, 2011).

Isker's debut feature as director was the comedy/action film La Planque (2011). The film was produced with the Alakis' association, a collective of actors, screenwriters, and directors founded in 2005 by Jalil Naciri in Ile-Saint-Denis. In the 2013 short film J'mange pas de porc (I Don't Eat Pork), he explores his cultural identity, as a Muslim with Algerian roots in France.

In 2017, Isker directed the television series Ben for France Télévisions, with filming taking place in and around the city of Nantes. Ben was released in 2018.

In 2020, Isker directed the detective telemovie Faux-semblants (Copy Cat), starring Thierry Godard and Noémie Schmidt. After being released in Belgium, it won Best Telemovie at the 25th edition of the Festival Polar de Cognac in 2020.

His 2021 telemovie Nobody's Child (L'Enfant de personne), was based on a true story of a child called Lyes Louffok who was shuffled around foster families and residential care, being poorly treated. He later became an activist and wrote of his experiences in Dans l'enfer des foyers (In the Hell of Homes). The film, which tells the story from the child's point of view, was broadcast on France 2 in November 2021. Nobody's Child starred Isabelle Carré. After the film was aired on TV, a live debate in which Lyes Louffok participated, took place on air. The three young actors playing the role of Louffok at different ages, Moncef Farfar, Yassine Chorfa, and Abdelmadjid Guemri, won the Jeune espoir masculin (Young Male Hope) prize at the Festival de la Fiction at La Rochelle.

The 2022 TV series Visions, starring Louane Emera and Soufiane Guerrab, is a supernatural/crime drama, centred around a young boy who has visions relating to people who have died.

In 2024, Tout le monde ment 2 (Everyone lies 2), directed by Isker and starring Vincent Elbaz, was released on France 2.

== Other activities ==
In January 2023, Isker visited his old school, Lycée du Parc des Loges, under a government scheme to associate artists with high schools, in order to bring younger generations closer to creation, art, and culture, and to increase their awareness of creative professions.

== Awards ==
- 2021: Best Film, Festival de la Fiction, La Rochelle, for Nobody's Child
- 2021: Prix Europa for best feature film, for Nobody's Child
- 2022: Best Director, Seoul International Drama Awards, for Nobody's Child
- 2022: Prix Média Enfance Majuscule, for Nobody's Child
