= Grand Corps Malade =

French slam poet

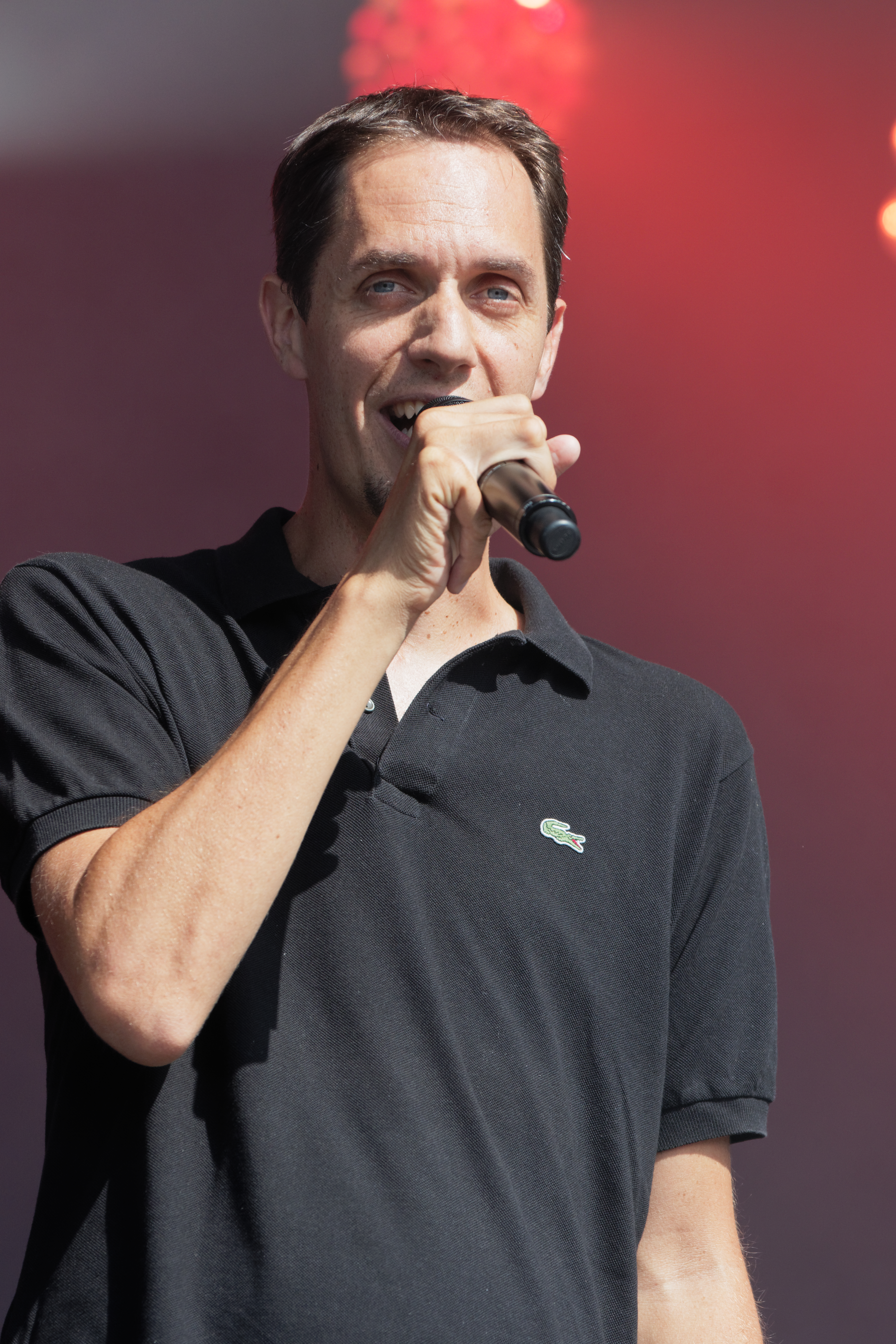
- GCM in 2018

Background information
- Born: Fabien Marsaud; 31 July 1977 (age 49); Le Blanc-Mesnil, Seine-Saint-Denis, France
- Genre: Poetry slam
- Occupations: Singer-songwriter; film director; screenwriter
- Instrument: Vocals
- Years active: 2003 – present
- Labels: AZ; Universal; Anouche Productions; Caroline
- Website: grandcorpsmalade.fr

Fabien Marsaud (born 31 July 1977), known professionally as Grand Corps Malade (GCM), is a French poet and songwriter. He has released seven studio albums so far, all of them reaching top-five status on the French SNEP chart. GCM started writing and performing a capella at slam events in 2003. Three years later, he signed with Universal's AZ affiliate and released his debut album Midi 20, which became a top-ten selling record of the year in France.

Grand Corps Malade's follow-up album, Enfant de la ville (2008), and third album 3ème temps (2010), were less successful commercially. In 2013, he released his family-inspired Funambule album, while Il nous restera ça (2015) featured 11 collaborations with other musicians. His sixth album, Plan B (2018), reached number two on the SNEP album chart. In 2020, he released Mesdames (Ladies), featuring ten duets with women, which topped the French charts. Its lead single, "Mais je t'aime" (But I love you), a duet with Camille Lellouche, became his highest-ranking song on the French singles chart.

GCM's accolades include three Victories of Music awarded by the French Ministry of Culture. His stage name means "tall, sick body" in French, a reference to his height (nearly 6'4" or 1.94m) and to a spinal injury that forces him to walk with a crutch, due to a diving accident in 1997 that initially led doctors to tell him he would never walk again.

== Early life ==
Marsaud was born on 31 July 1977 in Le Blanc-Mesnil, Seine-Saint-Denis. His mother was a librarian. His father, Jacques Marsaud, was a regional civil servant, a general commune secretary in Noisy-le-Sec and Saint-Denis, later on a director general of services at Val-de-Marne's departmental council and then at the Plaine Commune agglomeration community (fr: EPT). The family lived in Saint-Denis. Marsaud excelled in his classes, particularly in literary courses; he wrote his first works aged 14–15. But sports won out, and at one point he was simultaneously part of tennis, athletics and basketball clubs; the latter would become his greatest passion. At 17, he was offered a chance to join the training center in Toulouse, but preferred to stay in Saint-Denis. After playing in JSF Nanterre and in Saint-Denis, Marsaud signed with a third-division-level team in Aubervilliers. He earned a DEUG degree, majoring in physical education.

In July 1997, during a sports camp where Marsaud was a supervisor, a diving accident in a swimming pool caused him to displace his spine; he was later told he would never walk again. However, in 1999, after a year of intensive treatment, he regained the ability to walk, although he usually has to use a crutch or cane. Marsaud continued studying and earned a DESS master's degree in sport management. He worked in marketing for the Stade de France between 2001 and 2005, but became disillusioned with the job.

== Career ==
Marsaud discovered slam poetry in 2003 and started writing poems. On 23 October that year, he made his first appearance as a slam artist in a bar at the Place de Clichy in Paris, where he recited his first artistic piece entitled "Cassiopée". It is at that point he chose his stage name, Grand Corps Malade (GCM). He then took part in numerous poetry slam events with Collectif 129H and with his friend John Pucc'Chocolat. In 2004, GCM led "Slam'Alikoum", a monthly feature at the Café Culturel de Saint-Denis with Pucc'Chocolat. He co-founded "Le Cercle des Poètes sans Instru" ("The Circle of Poets Without Instruments"), a group of seven slam artists that includes John Pucc’, Droopy, Techa, 129H members and himself.

Grand Corps Malade gained increased fame in slam circles in 2005 through his appearances at Reservoir, a club that featured upcoming artists, including those of Jamel Comedy Club show, which filmed its episodes there. GCM opened for Cheb Mami at the Stade de France, and for Mouss and Hakim at the "Boule Noire". That same year, his friend S Petit Nico offered to record a musical track to accompany his poetry.

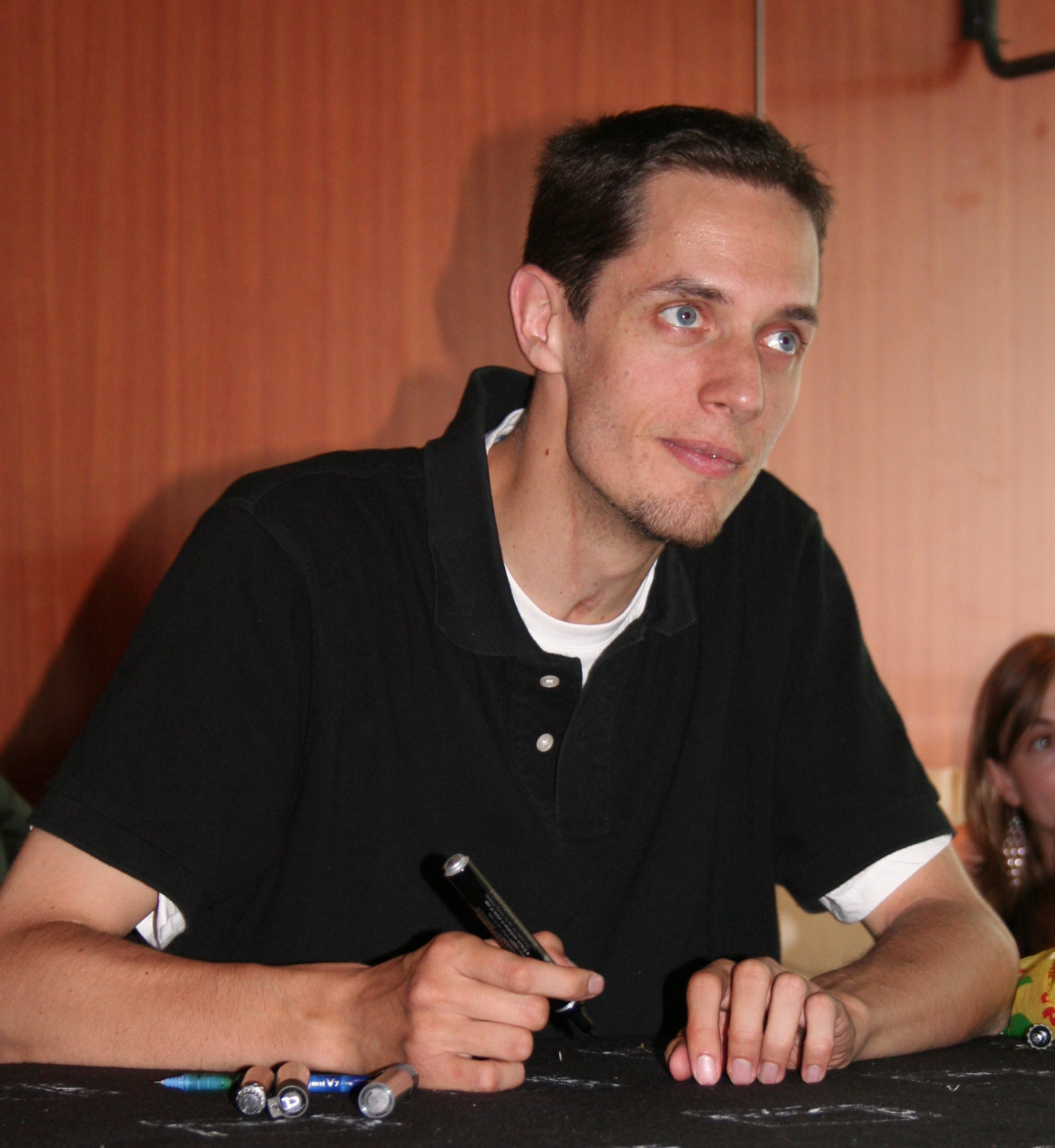
Grand Corps Malade signing for fans in 2006

GCM signed with the AZ label, and on 26 March 2006 released his debut studio album, Midi 20, which became one of the top ten selling albums of the year in France. To promote the record, he went on tour, doing 120 shows, including two sold-out concerts at the La Cigale theater in Paris and a performance at the Les Francofolies de La Rochelle festival.

In 2007, Grand Corps Malade won two Victoires de la Musique awards for 'Album revelation' and 'Stage artist stage revelation'. He appeared on numerous television shows and in Édouard Baer's Grand Cabaret.

In 2008, GCM released his second album, Enfant de la ville. The same year, he performed at the Festival d'été de Québec, gaining in popularity throughout the French-language speaking world. He also conducted workshops to introduce youngsters in his community to slam poetry in Saint-Denis and elsewhere. The result was the Génération Slam album, released in November 2008 by a diverse group of amateur slam artists.

The year 2010 saw the release of Grand Corps Malade's third studio album, 3ème temps, featuring collaboration with Charles Aznavour and a Shakespearean adaptation, "Roméo kiffe Juliette", a song in which two adolescent lovers living in a Paris banlieue faced a religious divide between Juliette's Jewish and Roméo's Muslim families. The song's video clip choreography was arranged by Bintou Dembélé, a pioneer in French hip hop.

In 2011, GCM released the "Inch'Allah" single featuring Reda Taliani; it became his most successful single to date.

In 2013, Grand Corps Malade released his fourth studio album, Funambule, after quitting the AZ label to work with the independent Believe Recording and Anouche Productions labels. His fifth album, Il nous restera ça, was released in 2015.

GCM's first feature film, Patients (2016), based on his own eponymous autobiographical novel describing his accident and rehab, was released commercially in 2017. He co-directed with Mehdi Idir, and filming took place in the institute where GCM did his physical therapy. The movie was a success in France and garnered four César Award nominations.

In 2018, Grand Corps Malade released his sixth studio album, Plan B, with producer Jean-Rachid. It was the first in which he sang, and also his first to top the French SNEP albums chart. The album was certified platinum in France. With the release of Plan B, GCM embarked on tour that included over 100 shows.

GCM's second film, teen comedy-drama School Life (2019), received positive reviews from critics. The movie was also co-directed with Mehdi Idir.

In April 2020, Grand Corps Malade released a charity single, "Effets secondaires", a collaboration with Mosimann and producer Rachid Kallouche, with all proceeds going to two hospitals in the Paris region. On 19 June 2020, GCM released the lead single from his upcoming seventh album: "Mais je t'aime" (But I love you), a duet with Camille Lellouche, for which he would receive a Victoires de la Musique award the following year. The single became his highest-ranking song on the SNEP singles chart to date, peaking at number nine. His Mesdames (Ladies) album, a tribute to women, was released on 11 September 2020 and includes collaborations with Véronique Sanson, Louane, Suzane, Laura Smet, Camille Berthollet and her sister Julie, as well as Manon, Amuse-Bouche, and Alicia. Mesdames reached number 1 on both French and Belgian albums charts, and was certified triple platinum in France.

== Artistry ==
Grand Corps Malade has helped slam poetry reach beyond the intimate settings of cafes and typical slam scenes. The lyrics on his albums are sometimes spoken a cappella, but are mostly accompanied by a minimalist background melody. GCM collaborates with musicians such as string quartets and flute players.

== In popular culture ==
- In 2007, French hip hop / jazz band Hocus Pocus mentioned him in their "Place 54" track from their eponymous Place 54 album.
- In 2007, French parody rap group Fatal Bazooka mentioned him in a slam from their T'As Vu ? album and in the "Crêpes au froment" track (a version of "Fous ta cagoule") in which they include a parody reference to his name, singing "Vas-y dis-leur toi aussi Grand Cul Malade !"
- In 2010, French singer Dorothée, during her show at l'Olympia in Paris, introduced her "Valise 2010" slam by giving her songwriter and friend Jean-Luc Azoulay the nickname "Grand Cerveau Malade".
- GCM's stage name is used in parodies of paronyms and antonyms, as in the program Groland with its "Petit Corps Normal" parody, and by Fabrice Eboué in the Jamel Comedy Club program when talking about Amelle Chahbi, calling her "P'tit corps salade". GCM was also parodied in a Guignols de l'Info broadcast on Canal+.

== Discography ==
=== Studio albums ===
Year	Album	FRA	BEL (Wa)	SWI	Sales	Certification
2006	Midi 20	3	4	28	FRA: 600,000	
2008	Enfant de la ville	2	6	15		
2010	3ème temps	3	4	20		
2013	Funambule	5	11	34	FRA: 95,000	SNEP: Gold
2015	Il nous restera ça	5	6	11		
2018	Plan B	2	2	4	FRA: 100,000	SNEP: Platinum
2020	Mesdames	1	1	3	FRA: 300,000	SNEP: 3× Platinum
2022	Éphémère (with Ben Mazué and Gaël Faye)	2	5	39		
2023	Reflets	3	3	11		
2026	Voir la mer	1	2	10		

Others

- 2009: Midi 20 / Enfant de la ville (a rerelease – 2 CDs) (FRA #189)
- 2017: Patients (soundtrack album for film under the same title)

=== Compilation albums ===
Year	Album	FRA	BEL (Wa)	Certification
2019	Collection 2003-2019	43	51	

=== Singles ===
Year	Single	FRA	BEL (Wa)	SWI	Album
2009	"L'ombre et la lumière" (with Calogero)	—	10	—	(Calogero album) L'Embellie
2010	"Roméo kiffe Juliette"	—	44	—	3ème temps
2010	"J'attends"	—	—	—	3ème temps
2011	"Inch'Allah" (feat. Reda Taliani)	59	—	—	Collection 2003-2019
2013	"Te manquer" (with Sandra Nkaké)	47	—	—	Funambule
2014	"15h du matin" (with John Mamann)	50	—	—	Non-album single
2017	"Espoir adapté" (with Anna Kova)	140	—	—	Plan B
2017	"Au feu rouge"	—	—	—	Plan B
2020	"Mais je t'aime" (with Camille Lellouche)	9	12	41	Mesdames
2020	"Mesdames"	83	12 (Note: Did not appear in the official Belgian Ultratop 50 charts, but rather in the bubbling under Ultratip charts.)(Ultratip)	—	Mesdames
2020	"Pas essentiel"	—	26	—	Non-album singles
2021	"Nos plus belles années" (with Kimberose)	49	17	—	Non-album singles
2026	"Le prochain rêve" (with Styleto)	—	24	—	Voir la mer
"—" denotes a recording that did not chart or was not released in that territory.

=== Other songs ===
Year	Single	FRA	BEL (Wa)	SWI	Album
2013	"Funambule"	189	—	—	Funambule
2016	"Pocahontas"	189	—	—	Il nous restera ça
2018	"Acouphènes"	180	—	—	Plan B
2018	"Plan B"	137	Tipparade	—	Plan B
2018	"Dimanche soir"	98	18(Ultratip)	95	
2020	"Derrière le brouillard" (with Louane)	42	—	—	Mesdames
2020	"Pendant 24h" (with Suzan)	128	6 (Ultratip)	—	Mesdames
2021	"Le sens de la famille"	188	—	—	

Others

- 2006: "6ème sens" (Midi 20)
- 2006: "Midi 20" (Midi 20)
- 2008: "Les voyages en train" (Midi 20)
- 2009: "Enfant de la ville" (Enfant de la ville)
- 2009: "Je viens de là" (Enfant de la ville)
- 2010: "Education Nationale" (3ème temps)
- 2010: "Définitivement" (3ème temps)
- 2015: "#JeSuisCharlie" (following the Charlie Hebdo shooting)
- 2019: "Je viens de là" (soundtrack School Life)
- 2020: "Effets secondaires" (charity single)

=== Other collaborations ===
- 2006: Covered "Les trompettes de la renommée" by Georges Brassens in a tribute album called Putain de toi
- 2007: Wrote the "Génération motivée" song for Tony Parker's eponymous album, Tony Parker
- 2007: Recorded "Juste une période de ma vie" as a duo with Rouda in the album, Musique des Lettres (music S Petit Nico)
- 2007: "Thème de Joe" and "Le Retour de Joe" on Dionysos' album, La Mécanique du Cœur
- 2008: "Je m’écris" featuring GCM & Zaho in Kery James' album, À l'ombre du show business
- 2009: Co-wrote "L'ombre et la lumière" with Alana Filippi for Calogero's album, L'Embellie and sang as featured artist
- 2010: "Terranova" in a duo with the I Muvrini group on their album, Gioia
- 2012: Co-wrote lyrics for "La mer et l'enfant" on Celine Dion's album, Sans attendre
- 2014: "La médaille" and "Dès que le vent soufflera" in a tribute album to Renaud, La Bande à Renaud
- 2015: Covered "Sintineddi" as a duo with A Filetta on the Corsican-French album, Corsu Mezu Mezu in Corsican language
- 2017: "Joli zoo" in a duo with Aldebert on his album, Enfantillages 3
- 2017: "Avancer" in a duo with Idir on his album, Ici et ailleurs
- 2020: "L'addition" in a duo with rapper Demi-portion on the album, La bonne école

== Filmography ==
- 2003: Décroche short film by Manuel Schapira – a cameo role, introductory music
- 2007: Moot-Moot TV series – voice role of an episode
- 2013: Jack and the Cuckoo-Clock Heart – voice role as Joe
- 2017: Sahara – voice role as Omar
- 2017: Patients – author, screenwriter, co-director
- 2019: School Life – co-screenwriter, co-director

== Awards and nominations ==
- 2007: Victoires de la musique
  - Won 'Album revelation' – Midi 20
  - Won 'Stage artist revelation'
  - Nominated for 'Audience artist revelation'
- 2007: Nominated for Félix Award as 'Most famous Francophone artist in Quebec' at the ADISQ gala
- 2009: Won Félix Award as 'Most famous Francophone artist in Quebec' at the ADISQ gala
- 2018: Nominated at the 23rd Lumière Awards for film Patients in 2 categories: 'Best first film' (with Mehdi Idir) and 'Best Music' (with Angelo Foley)
- 2018: Nominated at the 43rd César Awards for film Patients in 3 categories: 'Best film' (with Mehdi Idir and producers), 'Best first feature film' (with Mehdi Idir), and 'Best adaptation' (with Fadette Drouard)
- 2020: Nominated for NRJ Music Award – "Pendant 24 h" music video
- 2021: Victoires de la Musique
  - Won 'Original song' – "Mais je t'aime", GCM with Camille Lellouche
  - Nominated: 'Album of the year' – Mesdames

Honors

- Order of Arts and Letters: 2008 – Knight, 2014 – Officer, 2017 – Commander
