= Rouda =

Rouda is a surname. Notable people with the surname include:

- Harley Rouda (born 1961), American politician
- Kaira Rouda (born 1963), American author
