= 源信 =

源信 may refer to:

- Genshin (942–1017), Japanese scholar-monk
- Minamoto no Makoto (810–868), son of the Japanese emperor Saga

== See also ==
- Genshin (disambiguation)
- Makoto (disambiguation)
- Minamoto (surname)
