= Herlock Sholmes (Ace Attorney) =

- Ace Attorney character
- Herlock Sholmes as he appears in The Great Ace Attorney 2: Resolve (2017)
- First game: The Great Ace Attorney: Adventures (2015)
- Created by: Shu Takumi
- Based on: Sherlock Holmes by Arthur Conan Doyle
- Designed by: Kazuya Nuri
- Voiced by: English: Bradley Clarkson; Japanese: Shinji Kawada

In-universe information
- Occupation: Detective
- Family: Iris Wilson (foster daughter)

Herlock Sholmes, known as Sherlock Holmes (Japanese: シャーロック・ホームズ, Hepburn: Shārokku Hōmuzu) in the original Japanese language versions, is a fictional private detective in Capcom's Ace Attorney video game series, based on Sherlock Holmes by Arthur Conan Doyle and named in tribute to Arsène Lupin versus Herlock Sholmes by Maurice Leblanc in the English localization. Sholmes is featured as a supporting character in the two games of the spin-off prequel series The Great Ace Attorney Chronicles, consisting of Adventures and Resolve. The character has also appeared in the manga adaptation of the series.

== Characteristics ==
Sholmes is mostly presented as an outwardly eccentric and forgetful detective, who houses great intellect and deductive abilities. However, his reasoning skills are presented as being akin to a spontaneous "game of logic" that goes beyond the truth. Consequently, his deductions tend to consist of rapid-fire statements of abductive reasoning, that, while logically sound and clever, result in an incorrect, and often times ridiculous-sounding conclusion. Throughout his appearances, Sholmes aids defense attorney Ryunosuke Naruhodo and his partner Susato Mikotoba in honing their own deductive abilities, by allowing them to correct his deductions to arrive at the truth.

== Concept and design ==
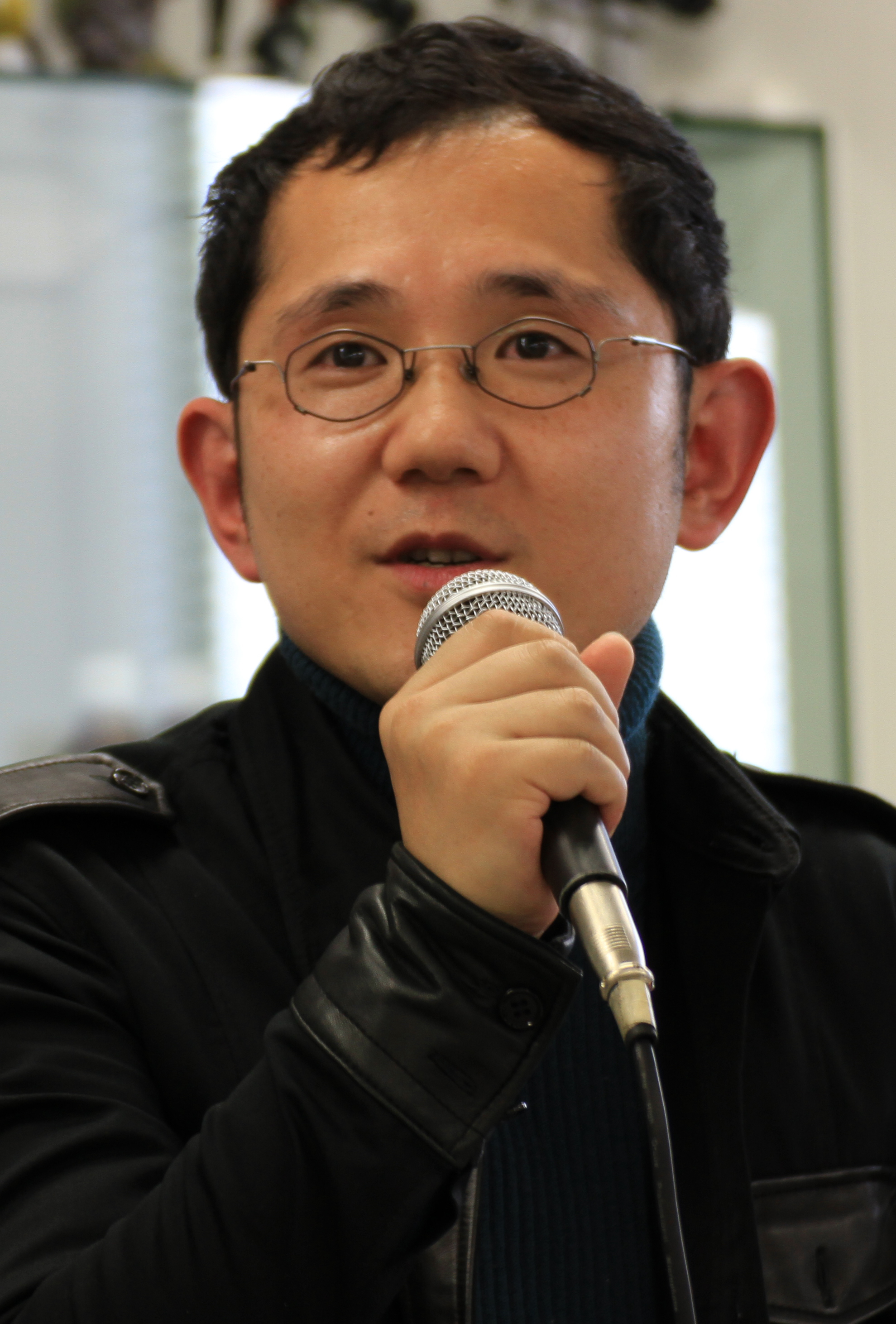
Shu Takumi created Herlock Sholmes.

Shu Takumi cited the origin of the Herlock Sholmes character as originating from a Sherlock Holmes game idea he had come up with in 2000: of a mystery game in which a detective makes incorrect deductions, and where players have to correct the detective and lead him towards the truth. Thinking it would be fun to combine this idea with Ace Attorney, Takumi pitched the idea to Capcom a few months after the Japanese release of Takumi's previous project, Professor Layton vs. Phoenix Wright: Ace Attorney (2012). The development team additionally decided to change "Sherlock's Watson" from the original, as they thought it would be more interesting if Watson weren't another English gentleman, using the original character name as a stand-in for the victim of the first case.

Kazuya Nuri designed Sholmes to make him look simple while also conveying a lot of information. He intended to make the graphics look like illustrations, and wanted to convey the feeling of the materials clothes and items from the Victorian era in which the series is set. Characters were designed to be partially realistic, as realistic animations and facial expressions were needed for the game. Witnesses and jury members were however designed in a more stylized way, to ensure that players immediately recognize them when they see the characters sitting next to each other. Several different variations were made for Sholmes' design, including "depressed", "cute", "adventurous", "dark", and "sleeping" variations; eventually, they used a variation on how Sherlock Holmes is traditionally depicted, as contrast to his personality. Additionally, he was given a gun as contrast to the sword of Ryunosuke Naruhodo. The design of Sholmes' daughter, Iris Wilson, was designed to include gothic elements, as well as elements of a mad scientist, and was created to look good when appearing together with Sholmes.

=== Localization ===
Due to long-standing copyright issues related to the character of Sherlock Holmes with the estate of Sir Arthur Conan Doyle, the character was renamed Herlock Sholmes for the international release in homage to Maurice Leblanc's Arsène Lupin versus Herlock Sholmes (1908); in the original Japanese language release of The Great Ace Attorney Chronicles, Sholmes is still known as Sherlock Holmes. Other existing Holmes characters were similarly renamed in the international release, such as Dr. Watson becoming Dr. Wilson.

== Backstory ==
Following an exchange program established by Klint van Zieks, a young Herlock Sholmes befriends Japanese student Yujin Mikotoba, solving many mysteries together, with Yujin taking notes about their adventures together, which he stores in Sholmes' trunk. However, after Klint is found to be the serial killer "The Professor" by Mikotoba's friend Genshin Asogi, who then kills him, Mikotoba is forced to return to Japan, leaving Klint's infant daughter Iris in Sholmes's care. While Iris initially believes Sholmes to be her biological father, Sholmes decides to tell Iris that his former partner is her father, not telling her his name to allow her to deduce it, which she mistakenly does to identify him as John H. Wilson. Compiling Sholmes' adventures and using John Wilson as a pen name, Iris publishes The Adventures of Herlock Sholmes in The Randst Magazine, leading to Sholmes becoming recognised worldwide as a legendary detective.

Over the coming years, Iris adapts her own adventures with Sholmes under the Wilson pseudonym. Sholmes eventually learns of the real Wilson's assassination in Japan by Asa Shinn via a telegram ordering the assassination, which contains orders for Kazuma Asogi to kill Tobias Gregson, travelling under the guise of a defence attorney. Sholmes reaches out to Mikotoba and attempts to intercept Asogi onboard the S.S. Burya, only for Asogi to apparently be killed by Nikolina Pavlova. Sholmes befriends Mikotoba's assistants Ryunosuke Naruhodo and Susato Mikotoba, the latter of whom is a fan of Iris' book, displaying his famed "Dance of Deduction". After discovering Asogi to be alive, although comatose and amnesiac, Sholmes secretly dumps his body in Hong Kong, where it disappears before it can be collected by the Japanese authorities, before obtaining political asylum for Pavlova in the United States. Upon his return to London the following month, Sholmes invites Ryunosuke and Susato to live in his attic and use it as a makeshift law office. As Ryunosuke and Susato gains more clients, Sholmes uses his Dance of Deduction to help the pair hone their deductive reasoning skills by allowing them to correct his purposefully incorrect assumptions.

Two months later, Sholmes learns that the reason his "violin" hasn't been working was that he had mistakenly taken a viola when leaving the pawn shop he had left it at, shortly after which point he meets pickpocket Gina Lestrade, whom he invites over for dinner. Later, Gina goes missing, and Sholmes goes back to the pawn shop to find her where he is shot by the intruding Skulkin brothers and hospitalized at St. Synner's Hospital. During a subsequent trial for the pawn shop owner's murder, for which Gina is accused, Sholmes escapes from the hospital and enters the courtroom disguised as a bailiff, where he delivers some vital evidence to Ryunosuke that is used to expose the true culprit. After the trial, the disguised Sholmes congratulates Gina, with neither Ryunosuke nor Tobias Gregson recognising him, to which Iris informs him that he doesn't have as much "presence" as he thinks he does.

Six months later, a near-bankrupt Sholmes is recruited by Esmerelda Tusspells to act as a wax figure at her wax museum in order to increase falling attendance, and investigate the disappearance of the wax figure of The Professor. After the wax figure is mysteriously returned in a headless state the following day, Sholmes is confronted by Ryunosuke and Susato over Asogi still being alive. While Sholmes admits his actions, he only gives a vague reasoning as to his motives. In a subsequent investigation, Sholmes manages to find the missing head alongside a bomb, which he identifies as identical to one which had exploded at the Great Exhibition, where Odie Asman had been murdered; at a subsequent trial, Sholmes assists Ryunosuke in exposing Head Coroner Courtney Sithe as the murderer. Sometime later, Sholmes decides to join the Red-Headed League in an attempt to earn money for rent by artificially dyeing his hair red. However, after being recognized and deducing the league to be a scam, he turns the same artists over to Scotland Yard.

The following day, Sholmes is hired by Evie Vigil to find her missing husband Daley, before learning from Gina that Gregson had been murdered and Barok van Zieks is accused of his murder. Shocked at the news, and believing the recently returned Asogi to have completed his mission, Sholmes leaves to investigate, ultimately reuniting with Mikotoba and inadvertently exposing to Iris that John Wilson isn't her father, and that Mikotoba was his partner. Identifying Judge Seishiro Jigoku as the true murderer and Lord Chief Justice Mael Stronghart as the mastermind behind the Assassination Exchange, Sholmes arranges for all necessary witnesses to be present outside the court, appealing to the gallery to force the trial to continue. After Stronghart is exposed, although with no physical proof of his crime, a hologram of Sholmes appears, revealing he was at Buckingham Palace with Iris and Queen Victoria, who had been watching the trial from the beginning via his hologram broadcast system. The queen strips Stronghart of all his powers and decrees that he will be tried for his crimes at a later date. Following Stronghart's arrest, Sholmes congratulates Ryunosuke before departing once again. That night, Sholmes catches up with Mikotoba by describing all the cases he had missed since their separation, giving Gregson's pocket watch to Gina.

Iris also admits that she no longer feels the need to keep searching for her birth father, acknowledging Sholmes as the only father she ever needed. Half a week later, Sholmes says goodbye to Mikotoba, Ryunosuke, and Susato as they return to Japan, saying it was fun being able to work on one more case with his partner. He expresses hope to do so once again in the future, when he would eventually visit them all in Japan himself. During the credits, Sholmes shows irritation at receiving a surplus of requests for his hologram system from various parties despite the secrecy of the closed trial, and contemplates escaping to Japan until things settle down. Iris also gives him a letter thanking him for everything he has done for her, causing him to burst into tears.

== Appearances ==
=== The Great Ace Attorney: Adventures ===
In the first prequel game, The Great Ace Attorney: Adventures, Sholmes mentors defense attorney Ryunosuke Naruhodo and his assistant Susato Mikotoba following the apparent death of his friend Kazuma Asogi on a steamship, making use of "Joint Reasoning", in which Sholmes makes quick deductions about a witness, and Ryunosuke and Susato point out contradictions in his theories, inspecting the witness and surroundings from various angles in order to find hidden clues that can help lead Sholmes to the proper conclusion. Upon their arrival to London, Sholmes invites Ryunosuke and Susato to live with him and his daughter Iris Wilson at 221B Baker Street and set up their law office in their attic, later befriending pickpocket Gina Lestrade.

=== The Great Ace Attorney 2: Resolve ===
In the second prequel game, The Great Ace Attorney 2: Resolve, Sholmes reunites with his partner Yujin Mikotoba after they return to London from Japan, investigating a case together. Sholmes is additionally revealed to have adopted Iris, with her biological father having been "The Professor", an infamous serial killer whom Sholmes and Mikotoba had investigated ten years earlier, hiding this information from her by allowing her to believe that her father was John H. Wilson, a doctor she had mistaken Mikotoba for, whom Sholmes had intended for her to see as her second father. After exposing the Red-Headed League hoax and helping Ryunosuke identify Chief Magistrate Mael Stronghart as the mastermind behind "The Reaper", Sholmes uses a hologram projector he invented with Iris to broadcast the events of the trial to Queen Victoria, with whom he meets for tea, who strips Stronghart of all ranks and orders for him to be secretly prosecuted at a later date. After Ryunosuke and Susato return to Japan, Sholmes is overjoyed when Iris acknowledges him as her father for the first time.

=== Merchandise ===
A limited edition release of The Great Ace Attorney: Adventures, sold only through Capcom's "e-Capcom" store, includes a box based on Sholmes' briefcase, Sholmes and Iris-themed plush toys, postcards, and stickers.

== Reception ==
Herlock Sholmes was received well by critics, especially for his comic relief throughout the series. Richard Eisenbeis at Kotaku criticized Sholmes' depiction as a "crappy detective" and "dunce", although praising his relationship with his daughter and depiction as "a far cry from the world's greatest detective you’ve come to know from the classic stories or popular culture." Similarly, Blake Woog of Twinfinite praised the "Joint Reasoning" mode, in which the player must point out contradictions in the detective's deductions, and Famitsu complimented the character's "unparalleled observation and deductive skills [which] see not only the 'truth' but sometimes go beyond the truth and become a 'rampage of logic.'" Kristine Tuting of OneSports praised the "unbeatable tandem" and chemistry of Sholmes and Wilson, describing both as "a great fit for Ace Attorney's humorous and pun-tastic naming convention.

Following the announcement of the "Herlock Sholmes" localisation in April 2021, several memes have been developed around the character and the circumstances of their renaming from "Sherlock Holmes" in conjunction with copyright law. Comic Book Resources lauded the "goofy moniker" of the character, complimenting its "fit with the comedic and sometimes irreverent tone of the Ace Attorney series, even if it does leave a few things lost in translation."

== See also ==
- Pop culture references to Sherlock Holmes
