= Aviary Attorney =

2015 video game

- Developer: Sketchy Logic
- Publishers: Sketchy Logic; Vertical Reach (NS)
- Engine: Construct 2
- Platforms: Microsoft Windows, OS X, Nintendo Switch
- Release: 22 December 2015: Windows, macOS; WW: 22 December 2015 Nintendo Switch; WW: 30 January 2020
- Genre: Adventure game
- Mode: Single-player

Aviary Attorney is a 2015 adventure game in the style of the Ace Attorney series. The player takes the role of a defence lawyer, and must investigate crimes and then defend their clients in court.

== Gameplay ==
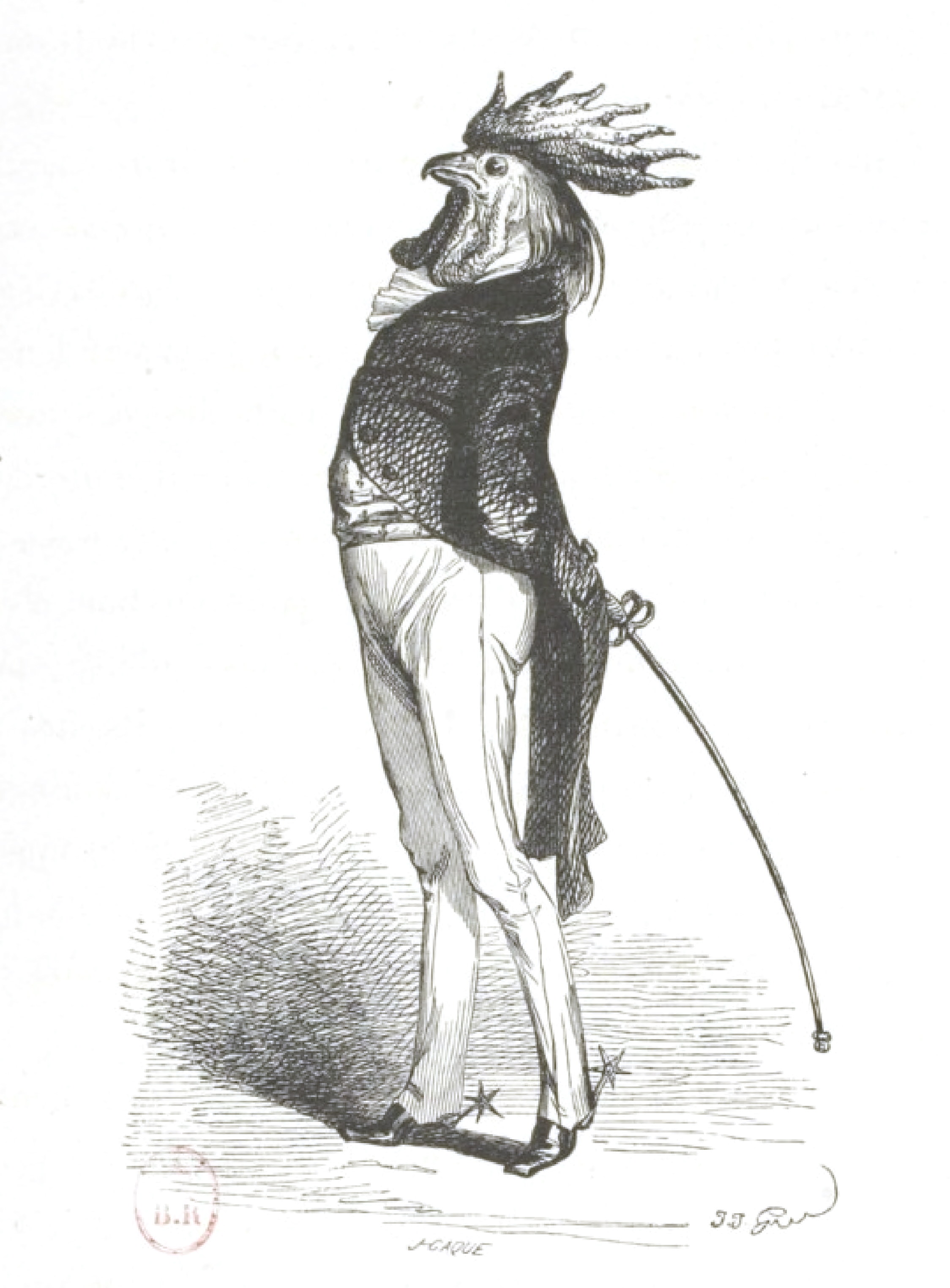
The character artwork is taken from the caricatures by J. J. Grandville.

The game is set in 1848 Paris inhabited by anthropomorphic animals, and the player takes the role of Jayjay Falcon, a defence lawyer who must defend a series of clients in court. For each case the player is given a limited number of days to explore various locations around the city of Paris, gathering clues, but also numerous red herrings. The player must then use the results of their investigation to cross examine witnesses at the trial, to try and procure a verdict of not guilty from the jury.

The game is composed of a series of cases. The game makes use of public domain works, the character artwork is taken from the caricatures by J. J. Grandville, and its soundtrack includes the music of Camille Saint-Saëns.

== Development ==
The game was developed by Sketchy Logic, and partly financed through a Kickstarter crowdfunding campaign, raising £18,917 towards its development in January 2015. It was released for Microsoft Windows and OS X in December 2015.

On 30 January 2020, Portugal-based Vertical Reach published a Nintendo Switch port under the title Aviary Attorney: Definitive Edition in North America and Europe, exclusively via Nintendo eShop. In November 2022, Singapore-based publisher Leoful announced they are launching the Nintendo Switch port on 15 December 2022 both digitally and physically for various Asian markets, such as Japan, Hong Kong, Taiwan, and Singapore, with Japanese and Chinese language support included.

== Reception ==
Reception

Aggregate score
Aggregator	Score
Metacritic	(PC) 77/100 (NS) 82/100

Review score
Publication	Score
PC Gamer (US)	78/100

Critical reception was generally positive, generating a score of 77/100 on reviews aggregation website Metacritic, Eurogamer recommended the game, highlighting the characters as "written with poise and wit, making for laugh-out-loud moments and genuinely exciting revelations". USGamer in their 3.5/5 review, described the artwork and the music as the "perfect accompaniment", but felt the game did not reach the same heights as the Ace Attorney series. Hardcore Gamer panned the game, giving it 1.5/5. They cited numerous bugs in the initial release, delay in the release of the final chapter, and the brevity of the game as reasons for the low score.
