= Genshin (disambiguation) =

Genshin (源信; 942 – July 6, 1017), also known as Eshin Sozu, was a Japanese Tendai scholar.

Genshin may also refer to:

== People ==
- Musashi Genshin, also known as Miyamoto Musashi (宮本 武蔵, c. 1584 – June 13, 1645), also known as Shinmen Takezō, Miyamoto Bennosuke or, by his Buddhist name, Niten Dōraku, a Japanese swordsman, philosopher, strategist, writer and rōnin.
- Hiraga Genshin (平賀 源信, died 1536), a retainer to the Takeda family towards the beginning of Japan's Sengoku period (1467–1615).
- Genshin Takano, (高野 源進 Takano Genshin, March 15, 1895 – January 4, 1969), a Japanese lawyer and Home Ministry and Police Bureau government official. Governor of Hiroshima Prefecture from June 10 to October 11, 1945.

== Video games ==
- Genshin Impact (原神), a fantasy video game
- Genshin, leader of the Black Spider Ninja Clan, a character in the Ninja Gaiden II video game
- Genshin Asogi, a character in the visual novel The Great Ace Attorney 2
