= The Great Ace Attorney: Adventures =

2015 adventure video game

- International cover art featuring the game's main characters, as seen in The Great Ace Attorney Chronicles.
- Developer: Capcom
- Publisher: Capcom
- Director: Shu Takumi
- Producer: Shintaro Kojima
- Designers: Shu Takumi; Yoichiro Ikeda; Junshi Jodai
- Programmer: Junichi Shiba
- Artist: Kazuya Nuri
- Writer: Shu Takumi
- Composers: Yasumasa Kitagawa; Hiromitsu Maeba
- Series: Ace Attorney
- Engine: MT Framework
- Platforms: Nintendo 3DS; Android; iOS
- Release: Nintendo 3DS: JP: July 9, 2015; Android: JP: August 30, 2017; iOS: JP: August 31, 2017
- Genres: Adventure, visual novel
- Mode: Single-player

The Great Ace Attorney: Adventures (Note: Known in Japan as Dai Gyakuten Saiban: Naruhodō Ryūnosuke no Bōken (Japanese: 大逆転裁判 ‐成歩堂龍ノ介の冒険‐; lit. Great Turnabout Trial: The Adventures of Ryūnosuke Naruhodō)) is an adventure game and the eighth installment in the Ace Attorney series, developed and published by Capcom. It was directed by Shu Takumi and produced by Shintaro Kojima. The game is a distant prequel to the Ace Attorney series, taking place in Meiji Japan and Victorian Britain, and loosely adapts characters and stories from Arthur Conan Doyle's The Adventures of Sherlock Holmes. It was released for the Nintendo 3DS in Japan in July 2015, with Android and iOS versions following in August 2017. A sequel, The Great Ace Attorney 2: Resolve, was released in Japan in 2017. Both games were released worldwide in July 2021 via The Great Ace Attorney Chronicles, a duology compilation for Nintendo Switch, PlayStation 4, and Windows.

== Gameplay ==
The game carries on the courtroom style gameplay of previous installments in the Ace Attorney series, including the fully 3D environments and character models previously featured in Phoenix Wright: Ace Attorney – Dual Destinies. Like previous titles, the game is divided between investigation, in which players explore areas to gather evidence and testimonies, and courtroom battles, in which players must use evidence to find contradictions in witness testimonies to find the truth behind a case. Similarly to Takumi's previous game, Professor Layton vs. Phoenix Wright: Ace Attorney, the player sometimes has to cross-examine multiple witnesses at the same time, potentially gleaning new information by addressing one witness when they react to another's statement.

The Great Ace Attorney introduces two new gameplay mechanics; The Dance of Deduction and Summation Examinations. During certain investigations, Herlock Sholmes will perform a "Logic and Reasoning Spectacular", in which he will come up with a flawed theory based on observations of the scene and the behavior of witnesses. Players will then have to examine the scene and witnesses carefully in order to correct Herlock's mistakes and reach a more logical conclusion. Summation Examinations take place during trials in which the jury, an aspect of trials in England, will unanimously decide on a guilty verdict. At these points, the player has to convince a majority of the jury to change their verdict so that the trial may proceed. Players accomplish this by comparing statements from two different jurors that contradict or otherwise prove strongly relevant to each other. This sometimes requires the player to press each juror and present evidence in order to change their statement.

== Premise ==
=== Setting and characters ===
Taking place near the end of the 19th century and the dawn of the 20th century (known in Japan as the Meiji Period, in Britain as the Victorian era), The Great Ace Attorney focuses on Ryunosuke Naruhodo, a student at Imperial Yumei University and an ancestor of primary Ace Attorney series protagonist Phoenix Wright. He is described as a character with a strong sense of justice, but who easily ends up in danger. Joining Ryunosuke is Kazuma Asogi, his friend from university who studies law. The concept of defense lawyers was merely "years old" in the judicial system at the time in Japan, so Asogi is qualified to stand in court already, and aims to transform the legal system via study in Great Britain. Ryunosuke and Asogi are aided by Susato Mikotoba, a judicial assistant. She is described as being an "ideal Japanese woman", and is also a progressive dreamer, and a lover of foreign mystery novels.

Upon traveling to England to further his studies, Ryunosuke meets and befriends world-famous British detective Herlock Sholmes (named "Sherlock Holmes" in the original Japanese release). Herlock is a very eccentric and free-spirited individual. Despite being genuinely intelligent, the rapid-fire, blasé nature of his abductive reasoning often leads Herlock to incorrect conclusions. Accompanying Sholmes is his assistant Iris Wilson (named "Iris Watson" in the original Japanese release), a ten-year-old prodigy and Sholmes' adoptive daughter. Iris is a genius inventor, and the author of "The Adventures of Herlock Sholmes".

=== Plot ===
In Japan, Ryunosuke Naruhodo is put on trial for the murder of a visiting university teacher, Dr. John H. Wilson. He is represented by his close friend Kazuma Asogi, while the prosecutor is Taketsuchi Auchi (the Meiji Period ancestor of recurring character Winston Payne). With help from legal assistant Susato Mikotoba, Ryunosuke and Asogi prove that the real murderer is Jezaille Brett, an English exchange student who had been studying under Wilson at the university. Her motive is left a mystery; she is to be sent to China and tried in a consular court.

Following the trial, Asogi leaves Japan to complete his studies in Great Britain but hides Ryunosuke in his baggage so he can see Asogi's debut in the courts. However, while Ryunosuke is asleep, Asogi is found murdered within his cabin, and the now exposed stowaway Ryunosuke is once again blamed for the murder. Working with Susato and eccentric passenger / detective Herlock Sholmes, Ryunosuke discovers that the real killer is Nikolina Pavlova, a world-famous Russian ballerina who fled Russia. She had unintentionally killed Asogi by pushing and breaking his neck on his bed's wooden knob after fearfully assuming that he was going to turn her in to the captain; in truth, he was attempting to introduce her to fellow stowaway Ryunosuke as an act of trust. After the incident is settled, Ryunosuke persuades Susato to let him take Asogi's place as a representative lawyer in Britain. She agrees and begins to heavily tutor him on English law for the remainder of the journey.

Shortly after their arrival in Great Britain, Ryunosuke and Susato meet Lord Chief Justice Mael Stronghart, who assigns them the defense of philanthropist Magnus McGilded, who has been accused of murdering bricklayer Mason Milverton within a moving omnibus. They go up against Barok van Zieks, a legendary British prosecutor known as the "Reaper of the Old Bailey" and are introduced to the British legal system, which uses a jury of six people to decide the verdict. During the trial, a smoke bomb is set off, forcing an evacuation of the courtroom. After court resumes, Ryunosuke and Susato cross-examine the newly discovered witness, Gina Lestrade, and discover evidence proving that Mason had been killed on the carriage roof, though van Zieks claims that this evidence had been forged after the smoke bomb had gone off. He is unable to prove this, and McGilded is subsequently acquitted, though Ryunosuke remains unsure of McGilded's innocence. Shortly after the trial, McGilded is killed after he returns to the omnibus and it is set on fire.

The following day, Ryunosuke and Susato take on the defense of the soon to be famous Japanese novelist Soseki Natsume, who is currently in London studying English as a nervous exchange student, and has been charged with aggravated assault following a stabbing in the street. During the trial, Ryunosuke proves that the stabbing was actually the result of a domestic disturbance between landlord John Garrideb and his wife Joan, who had thrown a knife at her husband, only for the knife to fall outside their window and unintentionally hit the victim. Soseki is declared not guilty and decides that he is going to go back to Japan. Meanwhile, Herlock invites Ryunosuke and Susato to live with him and Iris at 221B Baker Street and they set up their law office in their attic.

A few months later, Gina is accused of murdering pawnshop owner Pop Windibank. During the trial, where Iris aids Naruhodo, it is revealed that McGilded actually was Mason Milverton's murderer, and that the fire that killed McGilded was started by an assassin hired by Milverton's son, a telegraph station technician named Ashley Graydon. Graydon and an unwitting Milverton had been selling coded government secrets to McGilded, which eventually resulted in a fight that led to McGilded murdering Milverton; in revenge, Graydon killed McGilded and tried to steal back the encoded secrets from Windibank's pawnshop, causing him to accidentally murder Windibank in a confrontation. After the case is solved, Ryunosuke is suspended from practicing law due to revealing government secrets during the trial, while Susato returns to Japan after learning that her father Yujin is supposedly deathly ill.

== Development ==
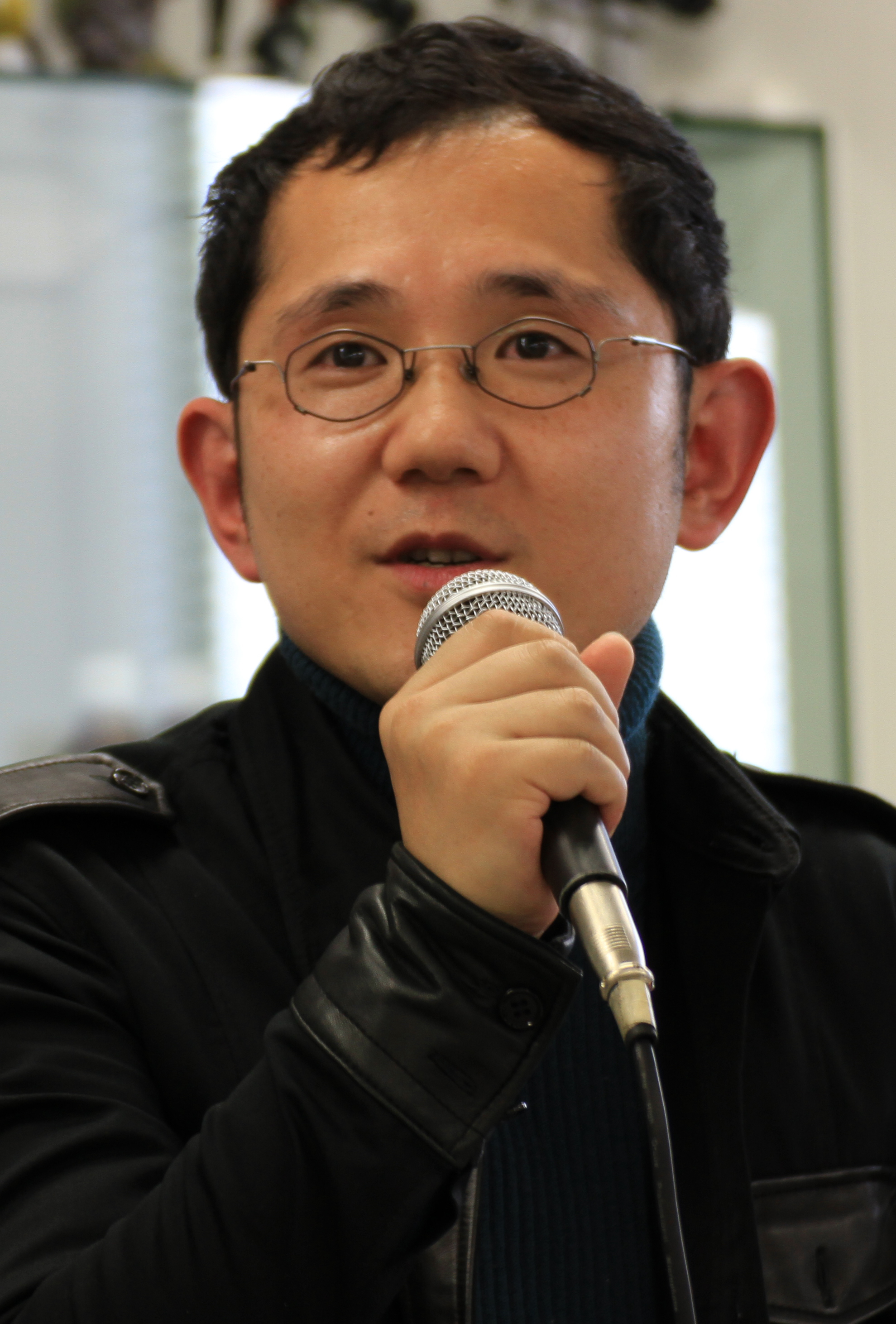
As with most entries in the series, the game was directed and written by Shu Takumi.

The Great Ace Attorney was developed by Capcom for the Nintendo 3DS. It was directed and written by Shu Takumi and produced by Shintaro Kojima, and features character designs and art direction by Kazuya Nuri and music by Yasumasa Kitagawa and Hiromitsu Maeba.

Development began in 2013, a few months after the Japanese release of Takumi's previous project, Professor Layton vs. Phoenix Wright: Ace Attorney, when he was asked to work on a new Ace Attorney game. At one point, he considered having the game focus on civil trials, but remembered a game idea he had come up with earlier: around 2000, he had the idea of a mystery game in which a detective makes incorrect deductions, and where players have to correct the detective and lead him towards the truth. He thought it would be fun to combine the idea with Ace Attorney, but did not expect Capcom to accept the idea.

Takumi had also been wanting to make a Sherlock Holmes game for a long time; because of this, Holmes was part of the concept all the way from the start. According to Takumi, he had several reasons for wanting Holmes in the game: both due to the gameplay, and as a way to separate the game from the main Ace Attorney series, as Holmes is from a different time period than the one the main series games take place in. This led to Takumi thinking about how Japan was at that time, and lead to new possibilities for the game's mysteries. Initially, Takumi had intended for the game to begin in London, thinking that it would be too much to create a Japanese court only for the prologue; this changed when Nuri said that he thought it should begin in Japan. The previous work in Professor Layton vs. Phoenix Wright: Ace Attorney helped Takumi establish the details for this setting.

Takumi found it challenging to write dialogue and using expressions appropriate for the way the Japanese language was during the Meiji period, as he had to avoid both too old-fashioned and too modern dialogue. As the Meiji period was a time when the lawyer profession was new in Japan, and when there was a lot of focus on becoming a part of "the new world" and becoming more Western, Takumi made sure to make the game reflect this. As Takumi had to create a new world for the story to take place in, it took longer than expected to write the game's scenario. The protagonist Ryūnosuke's character was based on how the main series protagonist Phoenix Wright would speak and act if he had lived during the Meiji period. When the development team wrote a list of ideas for names for the protagonist, "Ryūnosuke" was the first one to be suggested; it only took a few seconds for them to decide on it. Susato is based on the same concept as that of previous Ace Attorney heroines: she was designed to be a "perfect partner" and fun to spend time with, as the heroines of the series always are by the main characters' side. Her name was decided by choosing kanji characters that Takumi found pretty. The development team decided to change "Sherlock's Watson" from the original, as they thought it would be more interesting if Watson weren't another English gentleman.

=== Visuals and music ===
Unlike previous Ace Attorney games, both characters and environments are fully made in 3D. Like Takumi's earlier game Ghost Trick: Phantom Detective, spotlights light up characters while they dance; this was something that had not been done in previous Ace Attorney games. Motion capture of the former Takarazuka Revue actress Shiotsuki Shuu was used for some animations; as the Ace Attorney series is known for its poses and animations, this was chosen as a way to make the animation more dynamic. Nuri designed the characters to make them look simple while also conveying a lot of information. He intended to make the graphics look like illustrations, and wanted to convey the feeling of the materials clothes and items from the Meiji period were made from. Characters were designed to be partially realistic, as realistic animations and facial expressions were needed for the game. Witnesses and jury members were however designed in a more stylized way, to ensure that players immediately recognize them when they see the characters sitting next to each other.

Ryūnosuke was designed to have "the sharp look of a university student", which went without problems. It did, however, take a long time to design his haircut; Takumi wanted the haircut to be recognizable from Ryūnosuke's silhouette, but said that most people during the Meiji period had simple haircuts. Nuri tried designing various haircuts from that time, and designed around 50 variations. Susato was designed to be an elegant Japanese woman; because of the time period, it was decided that she was to wear a kimono. Takumi had several ideas for various items she could hold, but it was decided that it was best to keep her design simple, as contrast to the English characters. Several different variations were made for Holmes' design, including "depressed", "cute", "adventurous", "dark", and "sleeping" variations; eventually, they used a variation on how Holmes traditionally is depicted, as contrast to his personality. Additionally, he was given a gun as contrast to Ryūnosuke's sword. Iris' design included gothic elements, as well as elements of a mad scientist, and was created to look good when appearing together with Holmes. Asōgi's clothes were designed with influences from both Japanese and Western cultures. His headband, which flutters in the wind, was something Nuri really wanted in the game, and was something they were only able to do with 3D graphics. Van Zieks was designed to give off a "dark aura", with elements of vampires, wolves, and fallen angels. The game features 2D animated cutscenes produced by animation studio J.C. Staff.

When composing the game's music, Kitagawa used a mindset similar to that when composing for older games, trying to work within limitations to create strong music. He focused on creating catchy melodies, and went through a lot of trial and error. Takumi wanted the music to sound more "festive" than the electronic music used in earlier Ace Attorney games, so he asked Kitagawa to make use of a live orchestra, but with fewer instruments than in the previous game. He also wanted it to sound British, so Kitagawa ended up using sounds similar to chamber music. They did not think piano sounded right for the game, which led to difficulties in differentiating the instruments, as they only had string and wind instruments; because of this, they ended up introducing Spanish elements to the music. As a reference to how Holmes is known for playing the violin, they also tried using violins in the music.

== Release ==
The game was released by Capcom for the Nintendo 3DS in Japan on July 9, 2015. It was made available in various different editions. A limited edition, which is only sold through Capcom's "e-Capcom" store, includes the game, a box based on Holmes' briefcase, Holmes and Iris plush toys, a pin based on the one Ryuunosuke wears, postcards, and a Holmes-themed sticker. Another edition, also exclusive to e-Capcom, includes the game, a soundtrack CD, and a collection of illustrations. Additionally, there is one edition that includes the game and all the bonus items from the other editions. Pre-orders of the game also included a The Great Ace Attorney theme for the Nintendo 3DS home screen. A limited edition bundling The Great Ace Attorney with its sequel and a soundtrack CD with music from both games was released on August 3, 2017. The original soundtrack release was published by Capcom in Japan on July 15, 2015. Android and iOS versions of the game were released in Japan on August 30 and August 31, 2017, respectively.

According to Capcom France, there were no plans for a Western release of the game as of September 2015. According to producer Yasuyuki Makino, they wanted to release the game in Western regions, but knew proper localization would be a core challenge. In June 2016, Eshiro said that they want to release the game in the West, and that he is aware of fans asking Capcom for it, but that "certain circumstances" are preventing it from happening. A fan translation in the form of subtitled videos was created over the course of eight months and uploaded to YouTube; it was taken down by Capcom in June 2017, but reinstated by YouTube in July 2017 following a counter-notification by the translators. The videos have since been removed and the channel deleted, however. A complete English fan translation patch for the Nintendo 3DS and Android versions of the game was released in 2019, under the name The Great Ace Attorney: The Adventures of Ryuunosuke Naruhodou.

== Reception ==
The game won VGMO's 2015 Scores of the Year award in the "Traditional / Acoustic" category; the music was described as exceeding the "already high expectations" for the series, and being streamlined and varied with "high-quality instrumentation and engaging melodies".

== Sequel and compilation ==
In 2014, Takumi said that the game was planned to be the first title in a new series; A sequel, The Great Ace Attorney 2: Resolve, was announced in September 2016, and was released in Japan for the Nintendo 3DS on August 3, 2017, and for iOS and Android on April 24, 2018.

Capcom announced The Great Ace Attorney Chronicles, (Note: Known in Japan as Dai Gyakuten Saiban 1 & 2: Naruhodō Ryūnosuke no Bōken to Kakugo (大逆転裁判1&2 -成歩堂龍ノ介の冒險と覺悟-; lit. Great Turnabout Trial 1 & 2: The Adventures and Resolve of Ryūnosuke Naruhodō)) a bundle containing both Adventures and Resolve, in April 2021. It was released on July 27 in the West, and on July 29 in Japan and Asia, for the Nintendo Switch, PlayStation 4, and Windows via Steam. This version includes both English and Japanese audio tracks, an auto-advancing story mode, the downloadable episodes from Adventures and costumes from Resolve, and an in-game gallery for viewing artwork and music. Players that purchased the compilation early received the "From the Vaults" downloadable content, which adds additional art and music to the gallery.
