= Socrates Jones: Pro Philosopher =

2013 video game

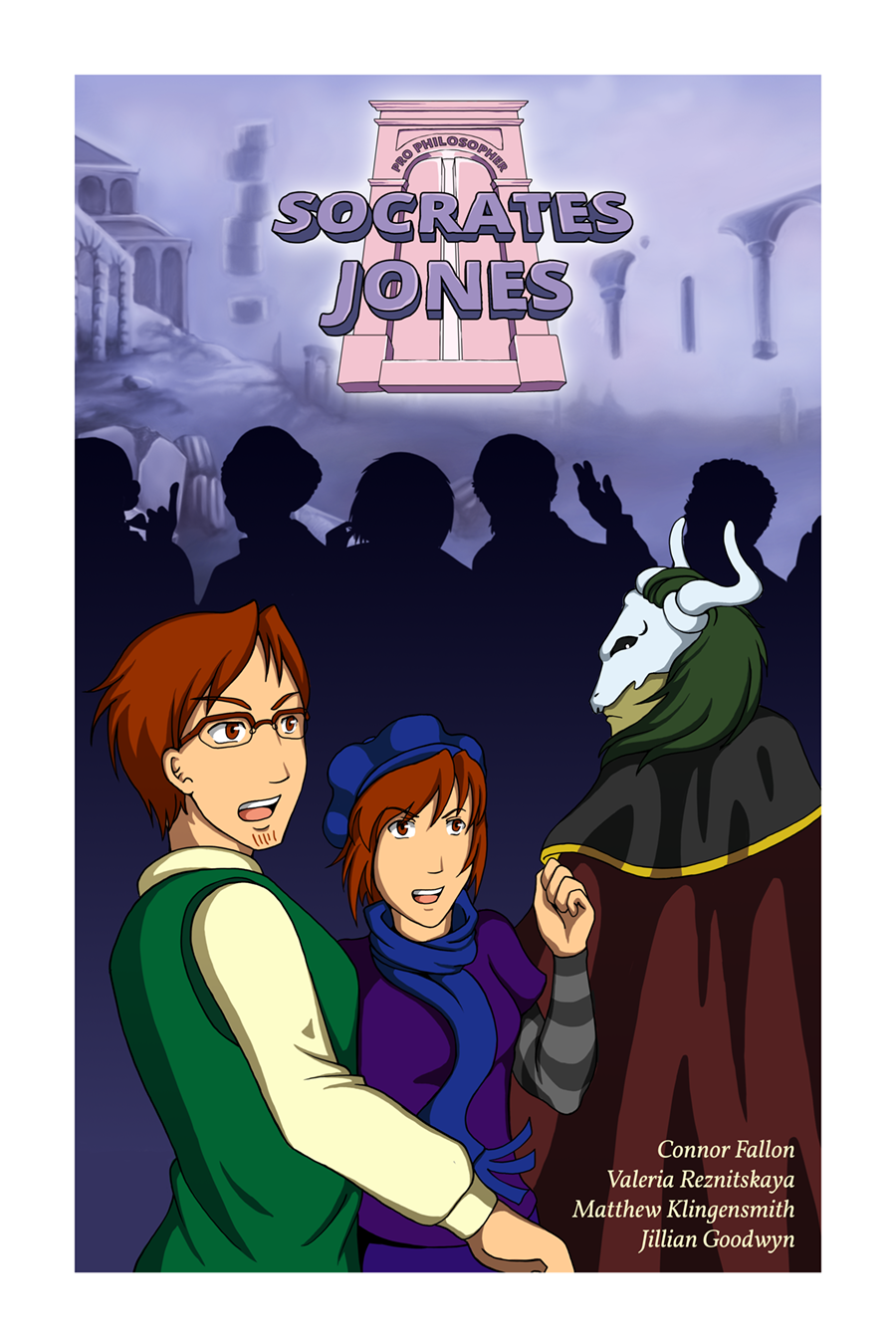
- Main characters Socrates Jones and his daughter Ari
- Developers: Connor Fallon; Valeria Reznitskaya
- Publisher: Intelligible Games
- Platforms: Browser; Microsoft Windows; Mac
- Release: Browser; August 20, 2013; Windows; March 28, 2023
- Genres: Visual novel, Educational game
- Mode: Single-player

Socrates Jones: Pro Philosopher is an educational point-and-click visual novel that was developed by a group of students and faculty at Carnegie Mellon University and released on Kongregate, with a later rerelease on Steam. The eponymous player character Socrates Jones debates historical philosophers to unravel the nature of morality. The game was inspired by Ace Attorney, from which it borrows a number of core mechanics.

== Gameplay ==
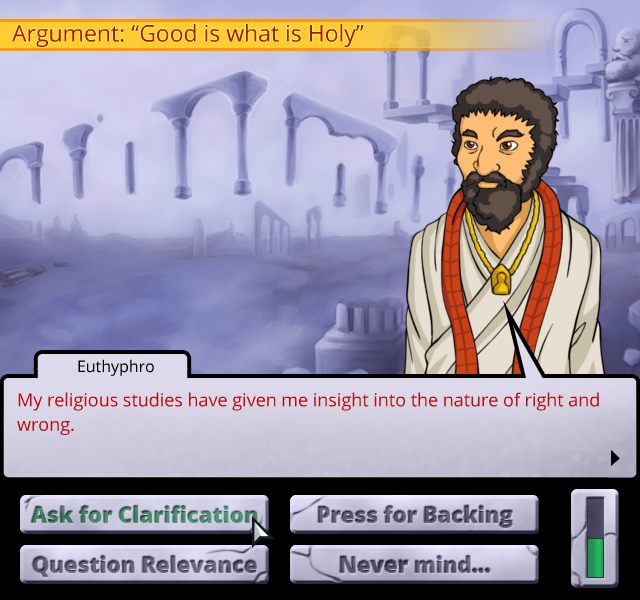
In this game, the player can ask for clarification, press for backing, question relevance, or (unpictured) challenge with evidence.

The gameplay of Socrates Jones: Pro Philosopher heavily borrows from that of the Ace Attorney series, modifying the catchphrase "Objection!" to "Nonsense!" to fit the game's topic. The players can examine each sentence of their opponents and ask for clarification, ask for the sentence's relevance or ask the opponent to back up their statement. Players can also challenge their opponents' claims by bringing up a counter-argument collected earlier in the argument. According to speakers at the 2014 ifMUD Interactive Fiction discussion, "the character has a set of things they need to explain/justify/come to terms with, and then a series of rhetorical moves they can make".

Claims by opponents are drawn from the "common ground" of what both the player-character Socrates and the opponent agree to be true. The opponent then builds on his claims in order to draw a conclusion. If a claim is vague, irrelevant or does not build up from the common ground, the player can question it. The players win a round when they challenge a statement made by their opponents with a counter-argument. The game has a "chronological difficulty curve", which increases the challenge as players meet characters who lived more recently.

If players make too many mistakes, their credibility meters deplete. When Socrates loses all of his credibility, the game ends and players can restart the round. The music mimics that of the Ace Attorney series, with simple, repeating motifs that gradually increase the sense of urgency as the player proceeds through the game.

== Plot ==
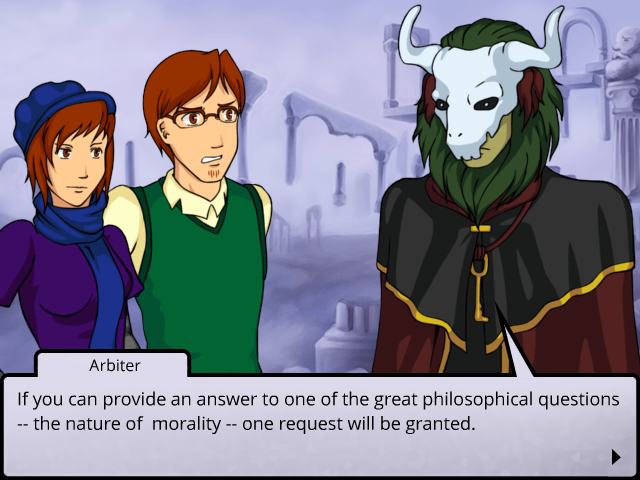
After dying, the Arbiter offers Socrates and his daughter a way back to the physical realm - by finding an answer to the nature of morality.

Except for himself, accountant Socrates Jones' family are interested in philosophy. During a discussion with a door-to-door salesman who is trying to sell deer repellent, a logically useless product, his daughter Ari teaches Socrates the basics of debating

After this scene, Socrates and Ari are involved in a car accident caused by driving into a deer and find themselves trapped in The Intelligible Realm, an afterlife for philosophers. According to the Arbiter, the discussion moderator, the only way to return to the world of the living is to find the nature of morality, a key topic in philosophy. This is followed by five discussions with dead philosophers Euthyphro, Protagoras, Thomas Hobbes, John Stuart Mill and Immanuel Kant, none of whom have an impervious solution. During these discussions, the arbiter reveals that Socrates' Ancient-Greek-philosopher namesake is the only philosopher found the answer, after which he disappeared.

At the final stage of the game, Socrates Jones says the nature of morality might be impossible to find. The arbiter accepts this statement as Socrates' answer and declares it to be wrong, resulting in a final debate between Socrates and the arbiter about the possibility of finding the nature of morality. Impressed with Socrates' arguments, the arbiter, who is revealed to be the philosopher Socrates, allows Socrates Jones and Ari leave The Intelligible Realm.

== Development ==
=== Conception ===
Connor Fallon played the Ace Attorney video-game series in 2009, and considered how the core gameplay could be applied to philosophy. A year and a half later, he assembled a team to explore this concept. the project was originally treated as a comical, one-off experiment but upon further exploration it became compelling. A prototype was created; this led the team to return to the project and adapt it into a full game. Alongside his Carnegie Mellon philosophy professor Andy Norman and friends from the Game Creation Society, they came up with three design goals; the game should teach the fundamentals of critical thinking, introduce players to the ideas of key historical philosophers, and be enjoyable to players with no interest in philosophy. Norman was inspired by his unpublished paper "How to Play the Reason-Giving Game".

=== Design ===
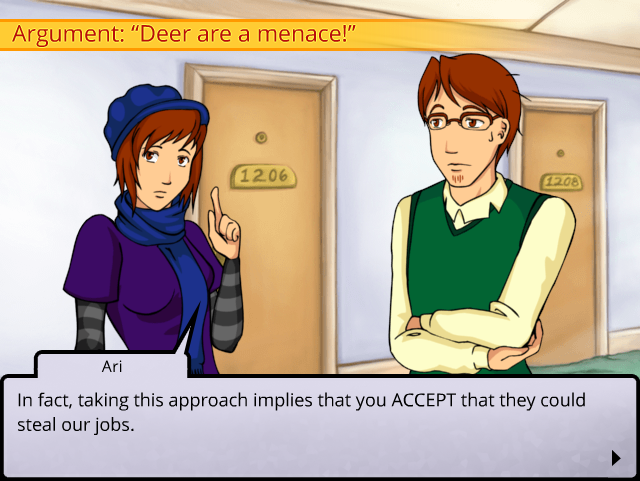
Playtesting allowed the designers to identify correct solutions they had overlooked.

Fallon and Valeria Reznitskaya became the game's primary developers. Early in the development phase, the design team noted that while Ace Attorney's inventory takes the form of concrete evidence, Pro Philosopher would rely on abstract ideas. Early development introduced a mechanic called the "idea cloud" that would simulate the pulling of ideas from thin air but these concepts were restricted because they would be limited by the programmers' work. They decided to simplify gameplay by simulating the Socratic method, in which the same critical thinking questions could be asked of each statement to break them down.

The designers noted during playtesting that there were alternative solutions to some of their puzzles. For instance, in the first round, the salesman comically argues that "deer steal our jobs", which the player is meant to counteract by asking for backing. Some players, however, presented the idea that "Deer live in the woods", arguing that they could not steal human jobs due to their location. The designers said this was a valid move and wrote into the game a customized response to it. One important game mechanic is the ad hominem attack "Your face is ugly", which always fails in-game and was designed to teach players that this type of argument is unhelpful and flawed. The game was designed to be more flexible and interactive than a book or film presentation of such philosophical debates.

=== Release, aftermath, remake, and sequel ===
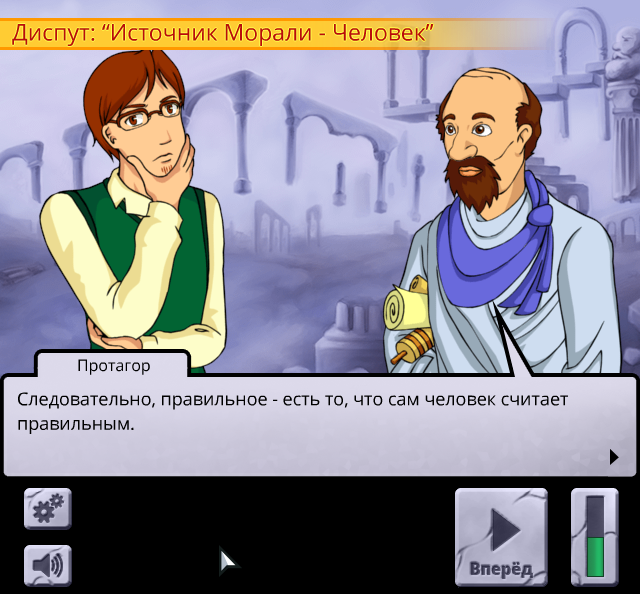
The game has been translated into various languages, including Russian

In early 2013, a beta build was uploaded to lockandkeychain.net and playtesters were solicited from gaming forums. Socrates Jones: Pro Philosopher was released as a free browser game; it was originally uploaded to Kongregate on August 20, 2013. The game became popular through a walkthrough video on the YouTube channel Philosophy Tube and by being hosted on Flash game websites. By March 2014, the game had been played over 300,000 times and was being translated into multiple languages. It has been used in classrooms around the world. As of April 2018, the game has been played 491,518 times at Kongregate, 20,000 times at JayIsGames, 72,574 times at Newgrounds, and 4,515 times at BuzzedGames.

Fallon believed the development team had not solved all of the problems of making a game about philosophical debating, settling on a concrete mechanics, logic puzzles, and single solutions. He believes the "necessarily simplified representation" teaches players basic principles to use beyond the context of the game and opens possibilities for future developers to explore the themes. Fallon intended to continue his career by telling more "odd interactive stories". The development team followed this game with a Hamlet-inspired game named Elsinore, in which Ophelia is trapped in a Groundhog Day-style loop and must escape her fate.

Socrates Jones: Pro Philosopher has been used as part of the Berkeley syllabus titled Social Implications of Computing.

On March 20, 2021, the team announced plans to rebuild the game in a new engine. On August 20, 2022, the Steam page for the rerelease was launched, with a projected winter launch. On March 28, 2023 the rerelease officially launched on Steam. This rerelease contained a new post credits scene teasing Pro Philosopher 2, which was formally announced on June 14 for a 2024 release date.

== Reception ==
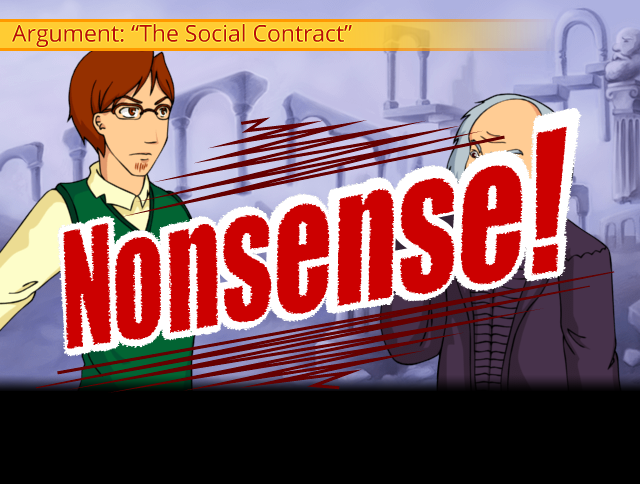
Matt Kodner of The Gameological Society noted the game's similarity to the Ace Attorney video game series, one aspect of which being the "Nonsense" motif, which borrows from the original's "Objection".

Jay Is Games was positive about Socrates Jones: Pro Philosopher, stating that it is "all about teaching you how to debate people in every day life" while still being "fun and engaging". According to the editor, the characters in Socrates Jones are "interesting, and the topics they discuss doubly so". The website also said the game is by design "wordy" and that players looking for more adventure-like aspects might find it too linear. In a 2013 article, Adventure Gamers noted the game demonstrates intelligence and offers a light tone while exploring serious intellectual discussions. A 2015 article by the site described the debates as witty and thought-provoking, and noted that while gameplay is unoriginal, the context to which it is applied is "perfect" and compelling. Teen Ink said the game's lack of ambition led to it becoming a simple teaching tool whereas expanding the narrative-based campaign would have garnered more respect from the gaming and education community. The website also compared it to the edutainment titles ARTé Mecenas and iCivics' Argument Wars. NeoTeo appreciated the game as a "sincere attempt" to explore themes not attempted in previous games, though noted various flaws, for instance, containing unrealistic arguments and discouraged non-English speakers from playing it.

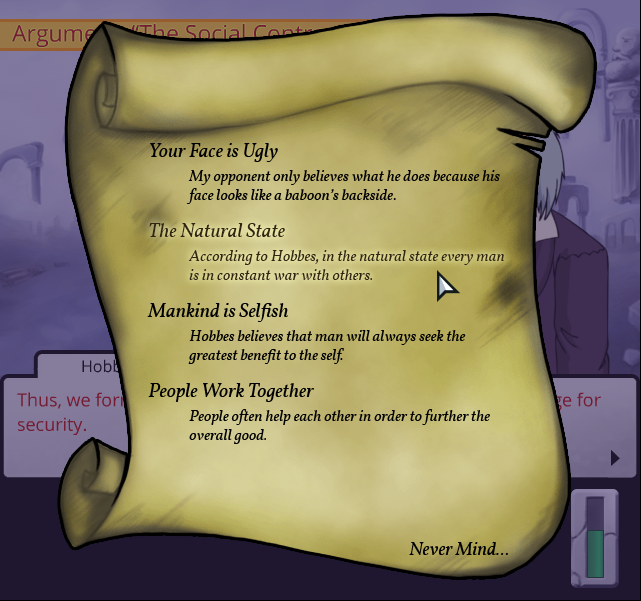
The "Idea Slate" mechanic presents ideas as the in-game inventory which must be presented to challenge statements in a similar fashion to how Ace Attorney's evidence file is used.

French review site Gamesidestory called Socrates Jones a gem, commending the game's original concept and philosophical content, and praising its "eloquent" conclusion. Gamesidestory criticized the game's shortness, stating that the seven debates included in the game are not enough. Matt Kodner of The Gameological Society was less positive about the game, stating that "much of the game boils down to you responding with, 'Nope, you’re wrong, and here's why'". Kodner described the game as a "novel introduction to philosophy" but said "it never goes beyond that". He also said noted that the game lovingly borrows from Ace Attorney and captures the original's sense of humor. IndieGames.com said the game teaches players how to argue and would satiate intelligent players' need to "poke holes in everyone's arguments". The title encouraged game designer Samuel Garcia to ponder the nature of God and morality due to the Euthyphro round, which asks, “Is what is morally good (holy) commanded by a god because it is morally good (holy), or is it morally good because it is commanded by a god?”.

The 2017 book Ten Things Video Games Can Teach Us: (about life, philosophy and everything) says the game teaches players to "learn about learning". Geektimes wanted to discuss the game with "unusual gameplay", hoping it would inspire future games that explored similar subject matter. PC Gamer said the game contains "a lot of text, a lot of clicking, and some great conversation". CMU’s Department of Philosophy faculty member Andy Norman called the game an "exceptional example of gaming’s educational potential" and a prime example of a space where "work and play become all but indistinguishable". Random Access said while it would not appeal to the average gamer, the title offers a special experience to gamers who are lovers of knowledge. The game was a 2014 entrant in the Independent Games Festival; the judges said the game is entertaining and funny, and incidentally imparts important critical thinking skills. Your Tewksbury Today said the "obvious parody" is both funny and thought provoking.
