= Ace Attorney =

Media franchise of adventure games

- Genre: Adventure, Visual Novel
- Developer: Capcom
- Publisher: Capcom
- Creator: Shu Takumi
- Platforms: Game Boy Advance; Nintendo DS; Windows; Nexon Mobile; Wii; iOS; Android; Nintendo 3DS; Nintendo Switch; PlayStation 4; Xbox One
- First release: Phoenix Wright: Ace Attorney; October 12, 2001
- Latest release: Ace Attorney Investigations Collection; September 6, 2024

Ace Attorney (Note: Known in Japan as Gyakuten Saiban (Japanese: 逆転裁判; lit. Turnabout Trial)) is a visual novel adventure game franchise developed by Capcom. With storytelling fashioned after legal dramas, the first entry in the series, Phoenix Wright: Ace Attorney, was released in 2001; since then, five further main series games as well as various spin-offs, prequels, and high-definition remasters for newer game consoles have been released. Additionally, the series has been adapted in the form of a live-action film and an anime; it is the base for manga series, drama CDs, musicals and stage plays. The player takes the roles of various defense attorneys, including Phoenix Wright, his mentor Mia Fey, as well as his understudies Apollo Justice and Athena Cykes who investigate cases and defend their clients in court. They find the truth by cross-examining witnesses and finding inconsistencies between the testimonies and the evidence they have collected. The cases last a maximum of three days; the judge determines the outcome based on evidence presented by the defense attorney and the prosecutor.

While the original Japanese versions of the games are set in Japan, the series' localizations are set in the United States (primarily Los Angeles) though retaining Japanese cultural elements. In the spin-off series Ace Attorney Investigations, the player takes the role of prosecutor Miles Edgeworth and in the prequel series, The Great Ace Attorney Chronicles, they play Phoenix's ancestor Ryunosuke Naruhodo.

The series was created by the writer and director Shu Takumi. He wanted the series to end after the third game, but it continued with Takeshi Yamazaki taking over as writer and director starting with Ace Attorney Investigations: Miles Edgeworth (2009). Takumi has since returned to write and direct some spin-off titles. The series has been well received, with reviewers liking the characters, story, and the finding of contradictions; it has also performed well commercially, with Capcom regarding it as one of their strongest intellectual properties. The series has been credited with helping to popularize visual novels in the Western world. As of June 30, 2026, the game series has sold 15 million copies worldwide.

== Games ==
Release timeline
2001	Phoenix Wright
2002	Justice for All
2003
2004	Trials and Tribulations
2005
2006
2007	Apollo Justice
2008
2009	Investigations: Miles Edgeworth
2010
2011	Investigations 2: Prosecutor's Gambit
2012	Phoenix Wright Trilogy HD (original mobile version)
2012	Professor Layton vs. Phoenix Wright
2013	Dual Destinies
2014	Phoenix Wright Trilogy (Nintendo 3DS)
2015	The Great Ace Attorney: Adventures
2016	Spirit of Justice
2017	The Great Ace Attorney 2: Resolve
2018
2019	Phoenix Wright Trilogy (Console/PC)
2020
2021	The Great Ace Attorney Chronicles
2022	Phoenix Wright Trilogy (updated mobile version)
2023
2024	Apollo Justice Trilogy
2024	Investigations Collection

The Ace Attorney series launched in Japan with the Game Boy Advance game Phoenix Wright: Ace Attorney in 2001, and has been published in the West since the release of a Nintendo DS port in 2005. The series currently consists of six main series games and five spin-offs.

=== Main series ===
- Phoenix Wright: Ace Attorney is the first entry in the series. It was originally released for the Game Boy Advance in 2001 in Japan; it has also been released for the Nintendo DS in 2005, Nexon Mobile in 2007, Microsoft Windows in 2008, and the Wii and iOS in 2009.
- Phoenix Wright: Ace Attorney – Justice for All was originally released for the Game Boy Advance in 2002 in Japan; it has also been released for the Nintendo DS in 2006, Microsoft Windows in 2008, the Wii in 2010, and iOS through the trilogy mobile port released in Japan in 2012, and in the West in 2013.
- Phoenix Wright: Ace Attorney – Trials and Tribulations was originally released for the Game Boy Advance in 2004 in Japan; it has also been released for Microsoft Windows in 2006, the Nintendo DS in 2007, the Wii in 2010, and for iOS through the trilogy mobile port released in Japan in 2012, and in the West in 2013.
- Apollo Justice: Ace Attorney was released for the Nintendo DS in 2007 in Japan and in 2008 in the West, for iOS and Android in 2016, and for Nintendo 3DS in 2017.
- Phoenix Wright: Ace Attorney – Dual Destinies was originally released for the Nintendo 3DS in 2013 in Japan, North America and Europe; outside of Japan, it was given a digital-only release. It was also released for iOS in 2014, and Android in 2017.
- Phoenix Wright: Ace Attorney – Spirit of Justice was released for the Nintendo 3DS in 2016 in Japan, North America and Europe. Like Dual Destinies, it was given a digital-only release outside Japan. It was released for iOS and Android in 2017.

=== Spin-offs ===
==== Ace Attorney Investigations series ====
- Ace Attorney Investigations: Miles Edgeworth was released for the Nintendo DS in 2009 in Japan and in 2010 in the West, and for Android and iOS in 2017.
- Ace Attorney Investigations 2: Prosecutor's Gambit was released in Japan for the Nintendo DS in 2011, and for Android and iOS in 2017.

==== The Great Ace Attorney series ====
- The Great Ace Attorney: Adventures was released in Japan for the Nintendo 3DS in 2015, and for Android and iOS in 2017.
- The Great Ace Attorney 2: Resolve was released in Japan for the Nintendo 3DS in 2017, and for Android and iOS in 2018.

==== Professor Layton crossover ====
- Professor Layton vs. Phoenix Wright: Ace Attorney is a crossover between Ace Attorney and the Professor Layton series. It was released for the Nintendo 3DS in 2012 in Japan and in 2014 in the West.

=== Compilations ===
- Phoenix Wright: Ace Attorney Trilogy contains the first three games in the series: Phoenix Wright, Justice for All, and Trials and Tribulations. It was released for iOS and Android in 2012 in Japan and for iOS in 2013 in the West, as Phoenix Wright: Ace Attorney Trilogy HD. It was later released for the Nintendo 3DS in 2014, and Nintendo Switch, PlayStation 4, Windows, and Xbox One in 2019 as Phoenix Wright: Ace Attorney Trilogy. Capcom removed the mobile-only version of the game from stores and replaced it with the console version on iOS and Android in 2022.
- The Great Ace Attorney Chronicles contains both games in The Great Ace Attorney series: Adventures and 2: Resolve. It was released in July 2021 for Nintendo Switch, PlayStation 4, and Windows. This was the first time both games were made officially available outside of Japan.
- Apollo Justice: Ace Attorney Trilogy contains the fourth through sixth mainline games: Apollo Justice, Dual Destinies, and Spirit of Justice. It was released in January 2024, for Nintendo Switch, PlayStation 4, Windows, and Xbox One.
- Ace Attorney Investigations Collection contains both games in the Ace Attorney Investigations series: Miles Edgeworth and 2: Prosecutor's Gambit. It was released in September 2024, for Nintendo Switch, PlayStation 4, Windows, and Xbox One. This compilation marks Prosecutor's Gambit's first official release outside Japan.

== Common elements ==
=== Gameplay ===
A cross-examination in Phoenix Wright: Ace Attorney; the player can move between statements, press the witness for details, and present evidence that contradicts the testimony.

The Ace Attorney games are visual novel adventure games in which the player controls defense attorneys and defends their clients in several different episodes. The gameplay is split into two types of sections, investigations and courtroom trials. During the investigations, the player searches the environments, gathers information and evidence, and talks to characters such as their client, witnesses, and the police. After enough evidence has been collected, the game moves on to a courtroom trial.

In the courtroom trials, the player aims to have their client declared "not guilty". They cross-examine witnesses, aiming to find lies and inconsistencies in the testimonies. They are able to go back and forth between the different statements in the testimony, and can press the witness for more details on a statement. When the player finds an inconsistency, they can present a piece of evidence that contradicts the statement. If the player is correct, the game presents a sequence that often starts with the protagonist shouting "Objection!" and pointing at the witness along with a shift in music before they begin to grill the witness with the inconsistency, which has become an iconic aspect of the series. Once enough evidence has been presented that conflicts the witnesses testimony, the witness will suffer a breakdown or occasionally would remain calm and reveal a major truth in the case. The player is penalized if they present incorrect evidence: in the first game, a number of exclamation marks are shown, with one disappearing after each mistake the player makes; in later games, a health bar that represents the judge's patience is used instead; and in 3DS games, the character's lawyer badge is used. If all exclamation marks or lawyer badges are lost, or the health bar reaches zero, the player loses the game and their client is found guilty.

Several Ace Attorney games introduce new gameplay mechanics to the series. Justice for All introduces "psyche-locks", which are shown over a witness when the player asks them about a topic they do not want to discuss; using a magatama, the player can start breaking the psyche-locks by showing the witness evidence or character profiles that proves they are hiding something. The number of psyche-locks depends on how deep the secret is; when all locks are broken, the topic becomes available, giving the player access to new information. Apollo Justice introduces the "perceive" system, where the player looks for motions or actions made by witnesses that show nervousness, similar to a tell in poker. Dual Destinies introduces the "mood matrix", through which the player can gauge the emotions of a witness, such as tones of anger when mentioning certain topics; if the player notices a contradictory emotional response during testimony, they can point out the discrepancy and press the witness for more information. Dual Destinies also introduces "revisualization", where the player reviews vital facts and forms links between evidence to reach new conclusions. Spirit of Justice introduces "divination séances", in which the player is shown the memories of victims moments before their deaths, and must find contradictions in the victim's five senses to determine what has happened. Professor Layton vs. Phoenix Wright: Ace Attorney introduces simultaneous cross-examinations of multiple witnesses, with the player being able to see and hear reactions from the different witnesses to the testimony and using this to find contradictions. The Great Ace Attorney introduces "joint reasoning", where the player finds out the truth by pointing out when their investigative partner Herlock Sholmes takes his reasoning "further than the truth".

The Ace Attorney Investigations spin-off series splits the gameplay into investigation phases and rebuttal phases, the latter of which is similar to the courtroom trials of the main series. During the investigation phases, the player searches for evidence and talks to witnesses and suspects. Things which the player character notices in the environment are saved as thoughts; the player can use the "logic" system to connect two such thoughts to gain access to new information. At some points, the player can create hologram reproductions of the crime scene, through which they can discover new information that would otherwise be hidden. Prosecutor's Gambit introduces "Mind Chess", where the player interrogates witnesses in a timed sequence that is visualized as a game of chess, with the player aiming to destroy the other character's chess pieces. To do this, they need to build up their advantage in the discussion by alternating between speaking and listening, and then choose to go on the offensive.

=== Characters and setting ===
Ace Attorney story chronology
Late 19th century
- The Great Ace Attorney: Adventures
- The Great Ace Attorney 2: Resolve
Present day
- Phoenix Wright: Ace Attorney
- Justice for All
- Trials and Tribulations
- Investigations: Miles Edgeworth
- Investigations 2: Prosecutor's Gambit
- Apollo Justice: Ace Attorney
- Dual Destinies
- Spirit of Justice

The protagonist of the first three games is the defense attorney Phoenix Wright, who is assisted by the spirit medium Maya Fey; in the third game, Phoenix's mentor Mia Fey is also a playable character. In the fourth game, the protagonist is the defense attorney Apollo Justice; in the fifth, Phoenix, Apollo and the new defense attorney Athena Cykes are all protagonists; and in the sixth, Phoenix and Apollo are the main protagonists, while Athena is playable in one case. The spin-off The Great Ace Attorney is set in England near the end of the 19th century, and follows Phoenix's ancestor Ryunosuke Naruhodo. Susato Mikotoba, Naruhodo's judicial assistant, is a playable character in one chapter.

Phoenix's childhood friend Miles Edgeworth, who is the protagonist of the Ace Attorney Investigations games, is a recurring rival prosecutor character; in addition to him, each new game in the series introduces a new rival: Franziska von Karma is introduced in the second game, Godot in the third, Klavier Gavin in the fourth, Simon Blackquill in the fifth, Nahyuta Sahdmadhi in the sixth, Barok van Zieks in Adventures, and Kazuma Asogi in Resolve. Most of the prosecutor characters are portrayed as powerful and arrogant characters of high social status and who care about keeping perfect-win records in court, and even may favor convictions over finding the truth, although most have secret motivations and sympathetic backstories and typically help the protagonist at the game's climax. Similarly to real Japanese prosecutors, the prosecutors in the series often directly oversee investigations, issuing orders to the police. Japanese attitudes towards the police force are reflected in the series, with the police being represented by incompetent characters such as Dick Gumshoe, Maggey Byrde, and Mike Meekins. In the world of Ace Attorney, trials only last three days, and usually end with a "guilty" verdict, with trials taken up by the protagonists of the games being rare exceptions. The outcomes of cases are decided by a judge, based on evidence provided by the defense attorney and the prosecutor.

In the original Japanese, the series takes place in Japan, while in the English localization, it takes place in an alternative version of Los Angeles in which Japanese culture is far more prevalent due to a lack of historic anti-Japanese policy. In other versions, the setting depends on region, with Asian languages such as Chinese and Korean following the Japanese version and European languages such as German and Spanish following the English version. The only official exception is the French version, which takes place in Paris.

== Development ==
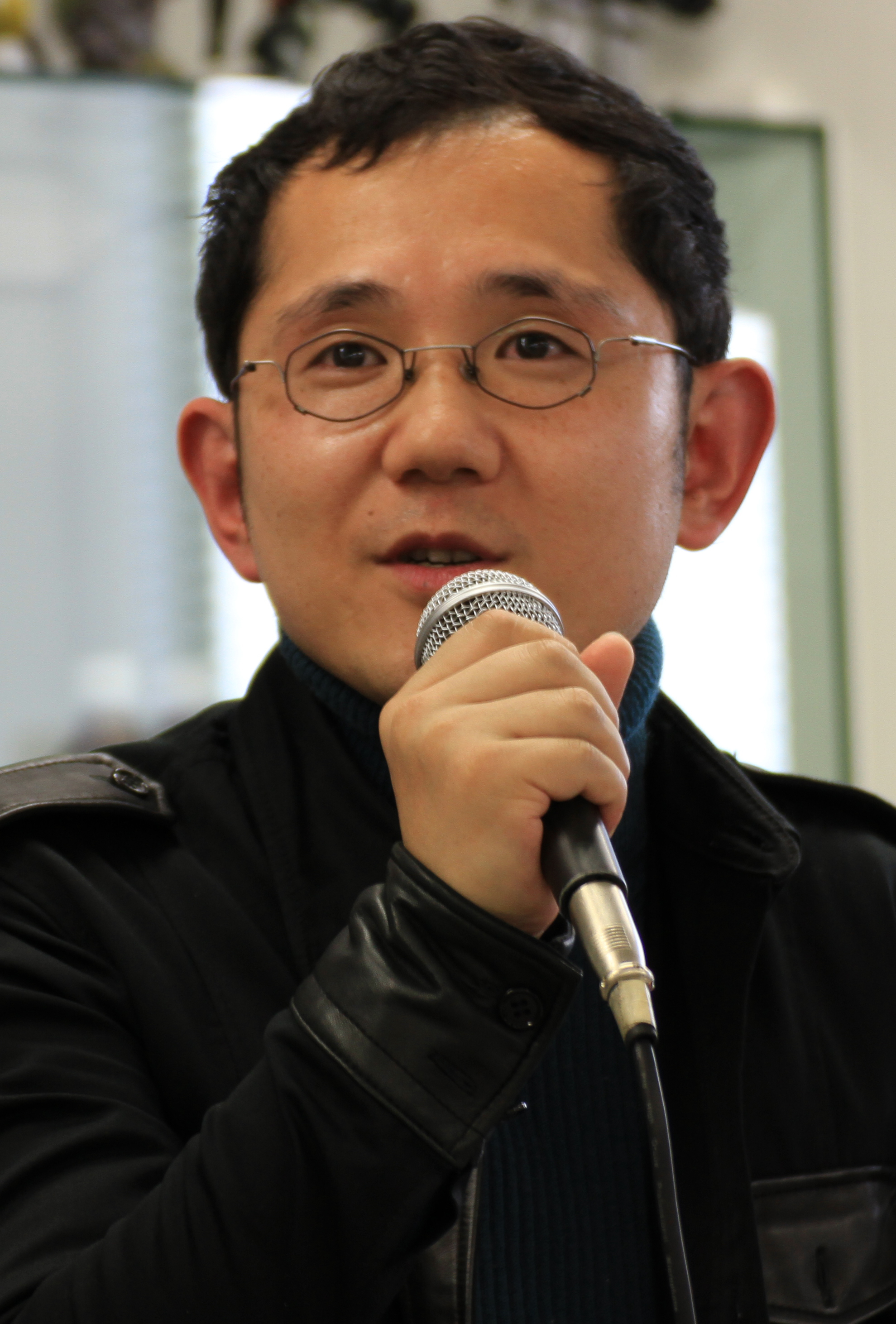
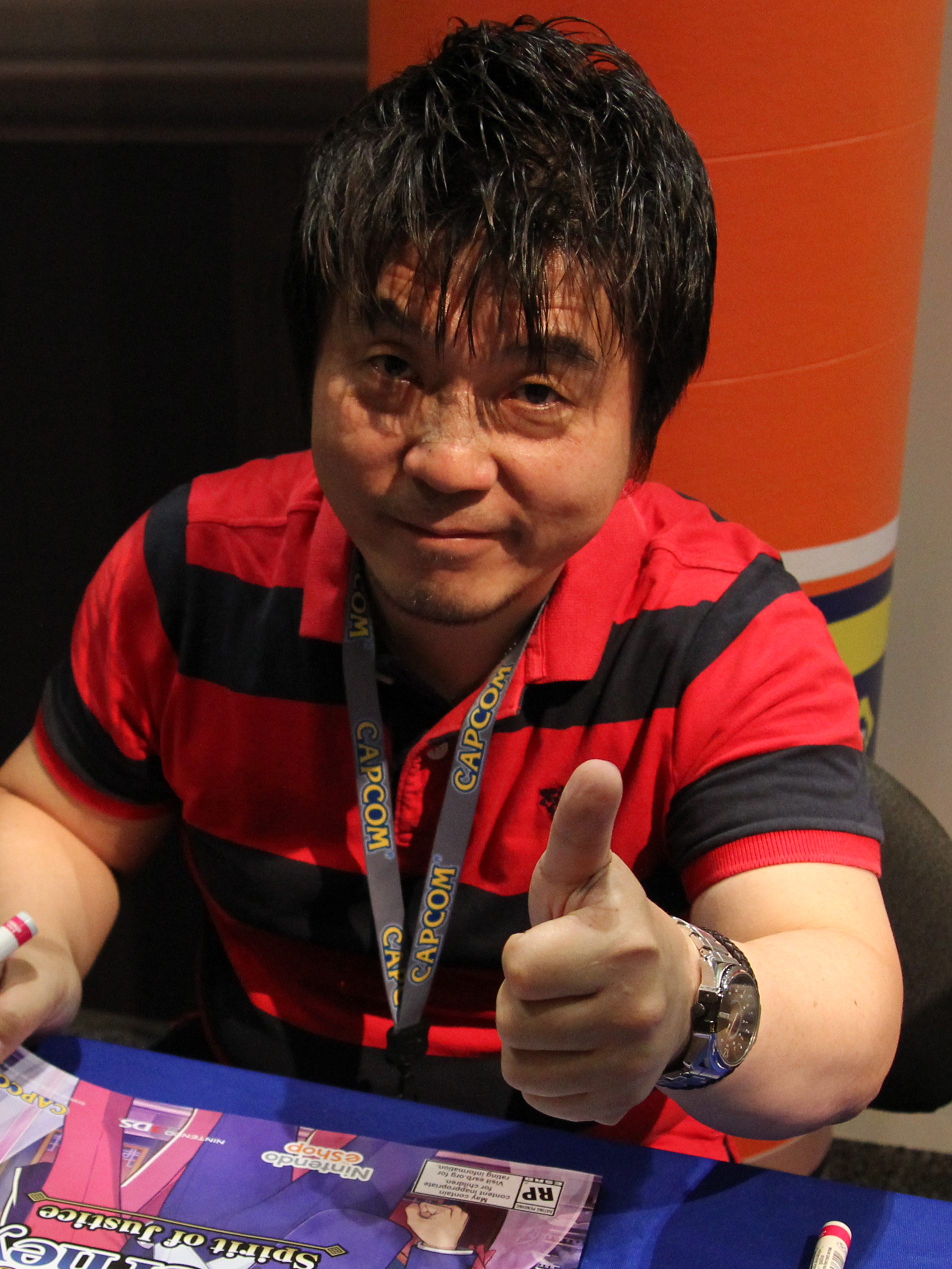
The series was created by Shu Takumi (left); beginning with Investigations, it has been handled by producer Motohide Eshiro (pictured, right) and director Takeshi Yamazaki.

The series was created by Shu Takumi, who wrote and directed the first three games. The first game was conceived in 2000 when Takumi's boss at the time, Shinji Mikami, gave him six months to create any type of game he wanted to; Takumi had originally joined Capcom wanting to make mystery and adventure games, and felt that this was a big chance for him to make a mark as a creator. The game was designed to be simple, as Takumi wanted it to be easy enough for even his mother to play. Originally it was going to be a detective game and Phoenix was a private investigator, but at one point Takumi realized that finding and taking apart contradictions was not related to detective work; he felt that the main setting of the game should be in courtrooms.

Takumi cited Japanese mystery author Edogawa Ranpo as being an inspiration, particularly The Psychological Test, a short story which involves a crime that "unravels due to the criminal's contradictory testimony." It had a big impact on him and was a major influence on the game. He was inspired by stories from another Japanese author, Shinichi Hoshi, saying that he was pursuing his "element of surprise and unexpectedness." Takumi felt that the best way to write a mystery with a good climax is to reveal various clues, and then pull them together into one conclusion, and not have multiple possible endings. He said that the biggest challenge with that was to make the gameplay and story work together. The goal was to make the player feel like they have driven the story forward themselves, with their own choices, even though the game is linear. He did not spend much time writing a backstory for Phoenix before writing the first game's story; instead he made up dialogue and developed Phoenix's personality as he went along. He came up with the partner character Maya because he thought it would be more fun for players to have another character with them, giving them advice, than investigating on their own.

After the first game's development was finished, Mikami told Takumi that they should make an Ace Attorney trilogy, with a grand finale in the third game's last case. Takumi had originally planned to let Edgeworth be the prosecutor in all episodes in the second game, but during the production the development team learned of the character's popularity which led to Takumi feeling that he had to use the character more carefully and sparingly; he created the new prosecutor character Franziska von Karma, to save Edgeworth for the game's last case and avoid a situation where he—a supposed prodigy—loses every case. Takumi wanted the three first Ace Attorney games to comprise three parts of a greater whole; therefore, he avoided having a lot of changes between games: art from the first game for main characters such as Phoenix, Maya, and Edgeworth was reused to avoid having the previous games look outdated in comparison to newer games in the series. No new gameplay mechanics were added for Trials and Tribulations, as Takumi was happy with the gameplay after having added the psyche-lock mechanic for Justice for All.

For the fourth game, Takumi wrote the scenario and took on a supervisory role. He had wanted the series to end with the third game, as he felt Phoenix's character had been fully explored and that his story had been told; he said that it is important to know when to end a story, that he did not want the series to become a shadow of its former self, and that he did not see any reason to continue it. Still, the spin-off series Ace Attorney Investigations was created, directed by Takeshi Yamazaki, and produced by Motohide Eshiro; Takumi returned to the series to write the crossover Professor Layton vs. Phoenix Wright: Ace Attorney. He also directed and wrote the spinoff series The Great Ace Attorney, the first of which was described as being the first entry in a new Ace Attorney series. He said that he has mixed feelings about the series being developed by other Capcom staff, comparing it to a parent sending their child to their first day in school. Yamazaki and Eshiro directed and produced the main series entries Dual Destinies and Spirit of Justice. Due to being exhausted after working on Dual Destinies, Yamazaki split direction responsibilities with Takuro Fuse for Spirit of Justice; Yamazaki worked on the scenario and Fuse on the art and gameplay. In 2020, Yamazaki left Capcom.

The games developed for the Game Boy Advance and Nintendo DS were created using 2D sprites, initially due to the limitations of the hardware. The developers had discussed switching to 3D models ahead of the development of Apollo Justice, but it was not until the Professor Layton crossover, which used 3D to a limited extent, that they realized the Nintendo 3DS could easily support 3D. Dual Destinies was developed around the use of 3D graphics, which remained a staple for future games in the series. Similarly, Level-5, the developers of the Professor Layton series, also started using 3D graphics after the crossover title.

In December 2025, Capcom expressed interest in growing the Ace Attorney series into a "core IP", alongside the Mega Man and Devil May Cry franchises.

== Localization ==
The localization of the first game was outsourced to Bowne Global; it was handled by the writer Alexander O. Smith and the editor Steve Anderson. While the Japanese version takes place in Japan, the localized version is set in the United States; because one of the episodes involves time zones, it had to be specified where the game takes place and the United States was selected without thinking a lot about it. The Japanese justice system of the original still remained intact in the localization, as changing it would have altered the entire game structure.

The change in the series' setting became important in later games and the Japanese setting is more obvious. Beginning with the second game, the series localization direction has been handled by Janet Hsu; One of their first decisions was how to localize Maya's hometown and the mysticism of the Fey clan. The localized versions of the Ace Attorney games happen in Los Angeles in an alternative universe where anti-Japanese laws like the California Alien Land Law of 1913 have not been passed, anti-Japanese sentiments were not powerful, and where Japanese culture flourished. That dictated the elements which should be localized and what should be kept as Japanese. Things relating to the Fey clan and the Kurain channeling technique were kept Japanese, as that was Maya's heritage; Japanese foods which were not widely known in the West were changed, such as changing Maya's favorite food from ramen to burgers. That particular change was mocked by players as the dish later became more well known in the West, and was lampshaded in the English release of Spirit of Justice, where Maya is described as liking both ramen and burgers.

Character names were localized using double meanings similarly to the Japanese names; the name puns were based on the characters' personalities or backgrounds, or were visual gags. Several English names were based on their Japanese counterparts, but for some characters the names had to be altered heavily compared to the Japanese versions. Smith and Anderson had a lot of freedom when localizing the names of minor characters in the first game, but discussed the names of the main cast with Capcom. Phoenix's English surname, "Wright", was chosen as his Japanese name, "Naruhodō"—meaning "I see" or "I understand"—is frequently used as a joke in the script. Dual Destinies was given a digital-only release in the West to release the English version as close to the Japanese release date as possible and maintain a tight development schedule. Its follow-up, Spirit of Justice, was released in the same manner. Both The Great Ace Attorney games were released in the West with English localization in July 2021 as part of The Great Ace Attorney Chronicles, while Prosecutor's Gambit was not localized until its inclusion in the Ace Attorney Investigations Collection in September 2024.

== Reception ==
Japanese and Western review scores As of November 6, 2025.
Game	Famitsu	Metacritic	OpenCritic
Phoenix Wright: Ace Attorney	32/40	81/100	—
Phoenix Wright: Ace Attorney – Justice for All	35/40	76/100	—
Phoenix Wright: Ace Attorney – Trials and Tribulations	35/40	81/100	—
Apollo Justice: Ace Attorney	36/40	78/100	75% recommend
Ace Attorney Investigations: Miles Edgeworth	34/40	78/100	—
Ace Attorney Investigations 2: Prosecutor's Gambit	32/40	85/100 (Note: Score of Ace Attorney Investigations Collection, a compilation that also includes Ace Attorney Investigations: Miles Edgeworth)	—
Professor Layton vs. Phoenix Wright: Ace Attorney	35/40	79/100	76% recommend
Phoenix Wright: Ace Attorney – Dual Destinies	37/40	81/100	—
The Great Ace Attorney: Adventures	35/40	86/100 (Note: Score of the compilation of both games, The Great Ace Attorney Chronicles)	—
Phoenix Wright: Ace Attorney – Spirit of Justice	34/40	81/100	81% recommend
The Great Ace Attorney 2: Resolve	34/40	86/100	—

The Ace Attorney series has been well received by critics, and has performed well commercially: in December 2009, it was Capcom's 9th-best-selling series of all time, and in October 2010, they called it one of their "strongest intellectual properties", with more than 3.9 million units sold worldwide. By December 2013, the series had sold over 5 million units. In the United States, the first game became surprisingly successful, forcing Capcom to prepare at least three additional runs to meet the demand. By June 2018, the series had sold over 6.7 million units. As of June 30, 2026, the game series has sold 15 million copies worldwide. Geoff Thew at Hardcore Gamer said that the "craziness" of the game world makes the cases entertaining, but also that it "resonates on a deeper level" due to its connection to the real Japanese legal system, making the setting still feel relevant in 2014. Bob Mackey at USgamer said that the Ace Attorney games were among the best written games of all time, and that the series' strength is how each game builds up to a "stunning and satisfying finale". Thomas Whitehead at Nintendo Life also liked the writing, praising its balance between "light-hearted nonsense" and darker, more serious scenarios. Several reviewers have appreciated the series' characters; Thew felt that Phoenix and Maya's banter is among the best in video games, and that Edgeworth's character arc is one of the most compelling parts of the stories.

Reviewers have liked finding contradictions; a common complaint, however, is the games' linearity, as well as how the player sometimes has to resort to a trial-and-error method because the games only accept specific pieces of evidence, and how testimony statements sometimes need to be pressed in a specific order. Some reviewers have criticized the lack of changes to the gameplay and presentation throughout the series, others have said that fans of the series would not have a problem with it. Several reviewers praised the series' music. They said that the greatest aspect of the series is its audio design, with the first three games using the Game Boy Advance sound chip better than any other game for that platform. Mackey has called the series' music phenomenal, with the exception of that in Justice for All, but said the sound effects are what "steals the show". He commented that the games' small amounts of animations for each character are used well for their characterization.

== Related media and other appearances ==
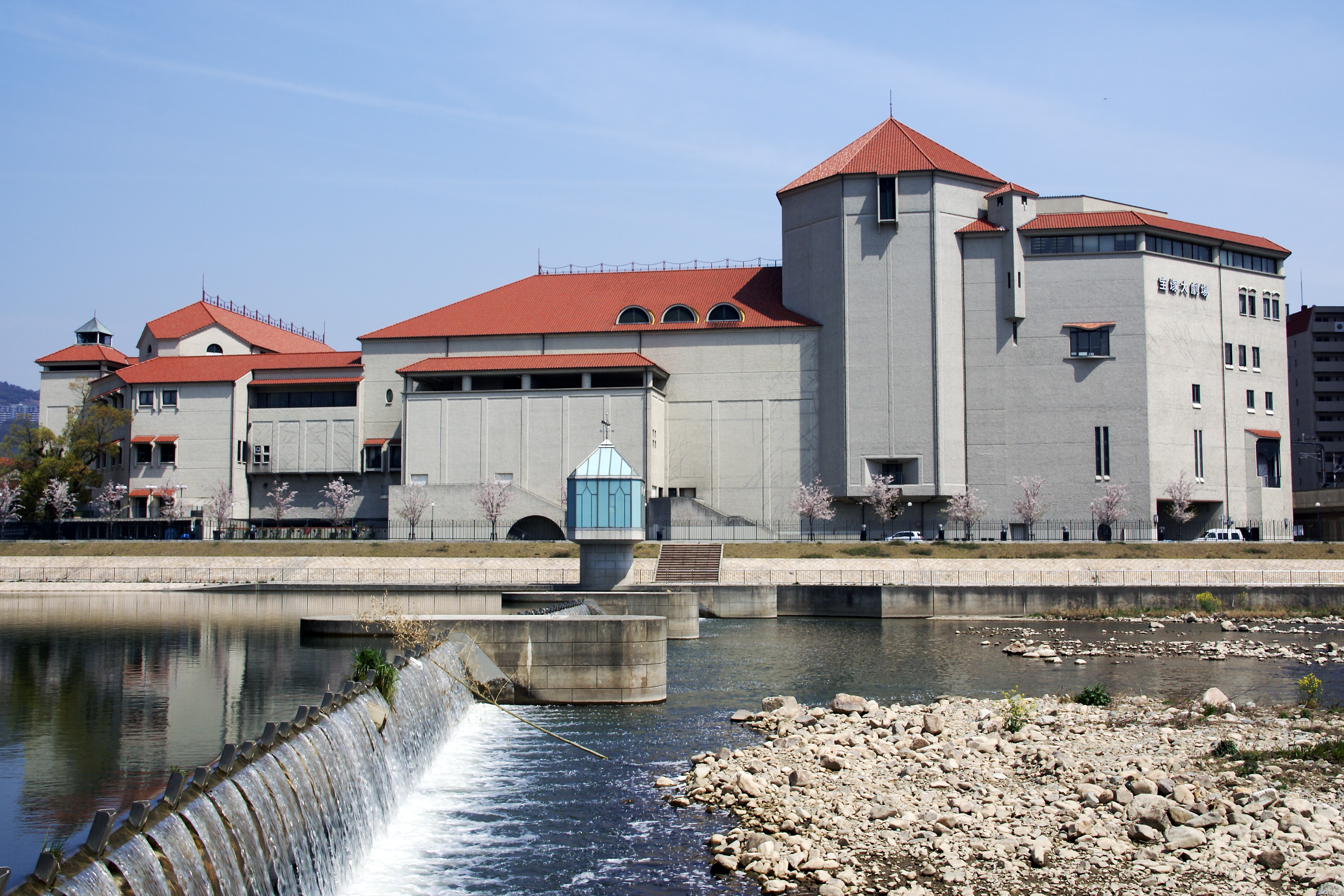
The Takarazuka Grand Theater; the all-female Takarazuka theater troupe adapted the series into musicals

The Takarazuka Revue, an all-female theater troupe, has adapted the series into stage musicals: 2009's Ace Attorney: The Truth Reborn, which is based on the last episode of the first game; 2010's Ace Attorney 2: The Truth Reborn, Again..., whose first act is an original story, and whose second is based on the final episode of the second game; and 2013's Ace Attorney 3: Prosecutor Miles Edgeworth, which is set before the events of The Truth Reborn, Again... In 2023, the Takarazuka Revue wrote and performed a musical based on The Great Ace Attorney, titled The Great Ace Attorney: New Truth Reborn. A stage play based on the series, titled Gyakuten no Spotlight, ran in 2013, and was written by Eisaku Saito. A 2012 live-action film adaptation of the first game, titled Ace Attorney, was produced at the film studio Toei and directed by Takashi Miike. A 2016 TV anime adaptation of the series, Ace Attorney, was produced at A-1 Pictures and directed by Ayumu Watanabe.

Kodansha has published several manga based on the series: a short story anthology was published in Bessatsu Young Magazine in 2006; Phoenix Wright: Ace Attorney and Ace Attorney Investigations: Miles Edgeworth were serialized in Weekly Young Magazine in 2007 and 2009, respectively; and another manga, which is based on the anime, was published in V Jump in 2016. A novel based on the series, Gyakuten Saiban: Turnabout Idol, was released in June 2016. Ace Attorney drama CDs, soundtrack albums, and figurines have also been released.

Ace Attorney characters have made crossover appearances in other video games. Some Ace Attorney characters appear in SNK vs. Capcom: Card Fighters DS. Phoenix and Edgeworth make a cameo appearance in She-Hulk's ending in the fighting game Marvel vs. Capcom 3: Fate of Two Worlds; in the game's update, Ultimate Marvel vs. Capcom 3, Phoenix appears as a playable character while Maya appears alongside Phoenix in his moveset, victory animation and Phoenix's ending in the game. Phoenix and Maya are playable characters in Project X Zone 2, while Edgeworth makes a non-player appearance. Phoenix, Maya, Edgeworth and Franziska were all playable in the mobile game Monster Hunter Explore in 2017, as part of one of its temporary crossover events, and a Phoenix transformation is available for a companion character in Monster Hunter XX. Music from the Ace Attorney series is featured in Taiko Drum Master: Doko Don! Mystery Adventure, with Phoenix making an appearance in the game's story. In April 2021, Ace Attorney was introduced to Teppen alongside the Dead Rising franchise with the "Ace vs. The People" expansion.

== Legacy ==
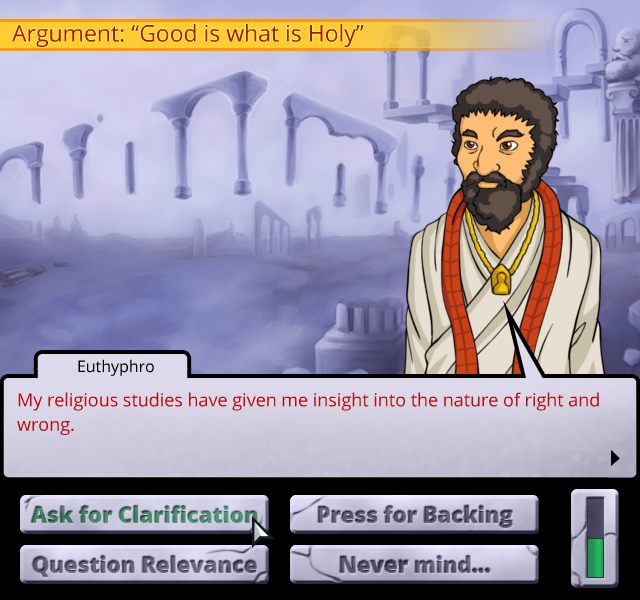
The series inspired Socrates Jones, which swaps law for philosophy.

In 2015, GamesRadar+ named Phoenix Wright: Ace Attorney as the 55th-best video game of all time. In 2016, Famitsu readers voted the original Gyakuten Saiban as the second-most memorable Game Boy Advance title (behind only Pokémon Ruby and Sapphire) and Gyakuten Saiban 123 as the tenth-best Nintendo 3DS game. In 2017, Famitsu readers voted Gyakuten Saiban the third-best adventure game of all time, behind only Steins;Gate and 428: Shibuya Scramble. The Ace Attorney series has been credited with helping to popularise visual novels in the Western world. Vice magazine credits the Ace Attorney series with popularizing the visual novel mystery format and noted that its success anticipated the resurgence of point-and-click adventure games as well as the international success of Japanese visual novels. According to Danganronpa director Kazutaka Kodaka, Ace Attorney's success in North America was due to how it distinguished itself from most visual novels with its gameplay mechanics, which Danganronpa later built upon and helped it also find success in North America.

The Ace Attorney series has also inspired many video games. The 2008 Capcom title Harvey Birdman: Attorney at Law, based on the animated series, reuses the gameplay mechanics of Ace Attorney. The 2013 title Socrates Jones: Pro Philosopher keeps the Ace Attorney format but swaps law for philosophical argument, and the 2015 adventure game Aviary Attorney features similar gameplay but with an all-bird cast of characters. The 2016 video game Detective Pikachu, which received a 2019 film adaptation, has also drawn comparisons to the Ace Attorney series. In the 2018 episodic role-playing game Deltarune, the character of Susie was originally inspired by Ace Attorney character Maya Fey: Susie was originally a "nice and cute" character like Maya, before Susie's character and design developed into a "thug". The 2023 visual novel Tyrion Cuthbert: Attorney of the Arcane also parodies the franchise, following a lawyer who defends clients in a supernatural setting. The 2025 ROM hack Hero of Law implements Ace Attorney gameplay mechanics and narrative tropes into the setting of The Legend of Zelda: Ocarina of Time (1998).

Ace Attorney is referenced in several anime shows. In a murder mystery arc of the 2006 anime series Haruhi Suzumiya, the show's titular character mimics Phoenix Wright during an episode. The 2014 anime series No Game No Life also pays homage to the game during an episode.

In early 2021, a user on Reddit created a bot which took selected Reddit forum arguments into short movies fashioned after Ace Attorney courtroom battles between the games' various characters. A similar bot was later created for the platform X (commonly known as Twitter). Later in the year, the San Francisco Chronicle noted its queer inspiration and influence: the first game inspired numerous fanwork which features same-sex pairings, and developers in turn took inspiration from yaoi (boys' love) in writing the sequels' characters.
