= Makoto (disambiguation) =

Makoto is a Japanese given name.

Makoto may also refer to:

- Makoto (game), a single-player aerobic electronic game
- Makoto (Street Fighter), a fictional character in the Street Fighter series
- Makoto, the name of one of the Megatokyo servers as well as one of the characters in the Megatokyo omake Grand Theft Colo: Otaku City
