= The Great Ace Attorney 2: Resolve =

2017 adventure video game

- International cover art featuring the game's main characters, as seen in The Great Ace Attorney Chronicles
- Developer: Capcom
- Publisher: Capcom
- Director: Shu Takumi
- Producer: Motohide Eshiro
- Designers: Shu Takumi; Yoichiro Ikeda; Junshi Jodai
- Programmer: Junichi Shiba
- Artist: Kazuya Nuri
- Writer: Shu Takumi
- Composers: Yasumasa Kitagawa; Yoshiya Terayama; Hiromitsu Maeba
- Series: Ace Attorney
- Engine: MT Framework
- Platforms: Nintendo 3DS; Android
- Release: Nintendo 3DS: JP: August 3, 2017; Android, iOS: JP: April 24, 2018
- Genres: Adventure, visual novel
- Mode: Single-player

The Great Ace Attorney 2: Resolve (Note: Known in Japan as Dai Gyakuten Saiban 2: Naruhodō Ryūnosuke no Kakugo (Japanese: 大逆転裁判２ -成歩堂龍ノ介の覺悟-; lit. Great Turnabout Trial 2: The Resolve of Ryūnosuke Naruhodō)) is an adventure game that serves as the tenth installment of the Ace Attorney series and the sequel to The Great Ace Attorney: Adventures, developed and published by Capcom. It was directed by Shu Takumi and produced by Motohide Eshiro. The game was released for the Nintendo 3DS in Japan in August 2017, with Android and iOS versions following in April 2018. Resolve was released worldwide in July 2021 via The Great Ace Attorney Chronicles, a duology compilation of both games for Nintendo Switch, PlayStation 4, and Windows.

The game won the Famitsu Awards 2017 in the Excellency category.

== Gameplay ==
The game focuses on the signature courtroom style of gameplay used in the Ace Attorney series, including the fully 3D environments and character models that became a part of the franchise since Phoenix Wright: Ace Attorney – Dual Destinies. Like its predecessor, most of the game's episodes are divided between two phases: investigation, in which players explore areas to gather evidence and testimonies; and courtroom battles, in which players must use evidence to find contradictions in witness testimonies to find the truth behind a case. In the latter phase, the player will sometimes have to cross-examine multiple witnesses at the same time, potentially gleaning new information by addressing one witness when they react to another's statement.

The game retains two additional gameplay mechanics introduced in The Great Ace Attorney: Adventures: the Dance of Deduction, and Summation Examinations. Dance of Deduction segments occur during certain investigations and involve correcting mistakes with a flawed theory on a crime issued by the character Herlock Sholmes, based on his observations of the scene and the behavior of witnesses. In these, players must correct his mistakes to reach a more logical conclusion, by examining the scene and witnesses carefully while comparing what is seen to what he states in his theory. Summation Examinations take place during trials, and focus upon convincing the jury to postpone declaring a guilty verdict in order to let the trial continue. Players accomplish this by comparing statements from two different jurors that contradict or otherwise prove strongly relevant to each other, and sometimes may be required to press a juror or present evidence in order to change their statement.

== Plot ==
Four months after the events of Adventures, Susato Mikotoba returns to Japan only to find her best friend accused of murdering Jezaille Brett, the murderer of John Wilson. Aided by her father Yujin, Susato disguises herself as the male cousin of her friend Ryunosuke Naruhodo and proves her friend's innocence by outing the real murderer, journalist Raiten Menimemo.

After the trial, she finds out that her father did not have a deathly illness and that her return home was due to a case she and Ryunosuke handled in England six months ago: while proving Soseki Natsume innocent of the poisoning of a failed actor, the pair discovered a jewelled dog collar in Natsume's apartment, stained in dried blood, but were forced by detective Herlock Sholmes to hand it over to the police, advising them and his assistant Iris Wilson to not disclose any details of their discovery.

Susato returns to England, where an explosion at the demonstration of an experimental teleportation device results in its inventor being held responsible for the death of a known crime lord who had financed the machine. Ryunosuke, seeking to defend him, receives permission from Lord Chief Justice Mael Stronghart to return to court after a six month absence from the courtroom. Facing off against infamous prosecutor Barok van Zieks — who holds a reputation as the "Reaper" for the defendants he prosecutes dying even if found innocent — he discovers the case is linked to a spate of serial killings ten years prior conducted with a dog handled by an individual called the "Professor", whose final victim was van Zieks's brother Klint. Ryunosuke proves the victim was murdered by Scotland Yard's chief coroner, Courtney Sithe, who was being blackmailed over fabricating evidence concerning the Professor's alleged execution. van Zieks reveals to Ryunosuke and Susato that the Professor was a Japanese man, while van Ziek's masked protégé reveals himself as an amnesiac Kazuma Asogi, Ryunosuke's best friend who was presumed dead months ago. Kazuma recovers his memories upon seeing a waxwork of the Professor, who he recognizes as his father, Genshin.

Days later, Inspector Tobias Gregson is murdered while investigating an outfit called the Red-Headed League. Despite their rivalry, Ryunosuke comes to van Zieks' defense when he is arrested as the prime suspect. However, he finds himself surprised to be facing off against Kazuma, who has accepted the case as its prosecutor. Due to the nature of the case, an order is given for the trial to be closed to the public, resulting in no jury being present. As the trial commences, Ryunosuke discovers that Kazuma came to England to investigate van Zieks, whom he blames for Genshin being accused of the Professor killings and executed. When a witness collapses after it transpires that they aided Genshin's jailbreak, the trial is suspended to allow for further investigation into the matter.

As the trial resumes, with Stronghart presiding over it as judge, Sholmes' investigation into the case, aided by Yujin — revealed to be his partner and not Wilson, as Iris had assumed — leads Ryunosuke to discover that Japanese Minister of Foreign Affairs Seishiro Jigoku murdered Gregson on Stronghart's orders, and that Stronghart was the mastermind behind both the Professor and Reaper killings. Admitting to the truth, Stronghart claims he was trying to create a crime-free England, using Klint as the Professor, initially to kill corrupt members of society, before conscripting Brett to kill van Zieks' defendants. When Genshin discovered the truth and killed Klint in a duel, he threatened to use a confession written by Klint to expose Stronghart, but was later murdered by Jigoku on Stronghart's orders when his fake execution was accidentally uncovered by mistake. Unable to find the confession amongst Genshin's possessions, Stronghart framed Genshin for the Professor killings, and ten years later had both Wilson and Gregson, who forged the Professor's autopsy, murdered to avoid the truth coming out. Despite Ryunosuke and Kazuma finding the confession on a missing page of Klint's will hidden in Genshin's katana, Stronghart declares he is untouchable, but Sholmes arrives with news that the Queen has learned of Stronghart's crimes and ordered his arrest. With the trial resolved, Yujin reveals to Ryunosuke that Iris is actually Klint's daughter, not Wilson's, and that he and Sholmes hid this knowledge from her for her protection. After making peace with both van Zieks and Kazuma, who decides to remain a prosecutor, Ryunosuke returns to Japan with Susato.

== Reception ==
Reception

Review score
Publication	Score
Famitsu	9/10, 9/10, 8/10, 8/10

For the 3DS, the download version of Dai Gyakuten Saiban: Naruhodō Ryūnosuke no Kakugo was #12 on the most downloaded games from the Nintendo eShop in 2020, years after the 2017 release but when new 3DS games had largely stopped being released.
