= Makoto (game) =

American game invented in 1992

Makoto is a game invented in Colorado in 1992. It is played in the Makoto Arena. In 2002, Makoto USA, Inc. (www.makoto-usa.com) purchased all intellectual property from the original designers and have been improving/redesigning it ever since. The current Makoto Arena bears little resemblance to the original design with the exception of the three towers and triangular design. The current Makoto Arena utilizes a Windows-based computer to control the lights and sounds of the game as well as to track scores.

== Playing Court and Equipment ==
A Makoto court consists of three metal beams arranged in an equilateral triangle on the floor. At each corner of the triangle there is a six-foot-tall column, equipped with a speaker. Each column has twelve targets which have pressure sensors. There are optional floor targets that can add four more targets to each column for a total of 48 targets in the arena.

== Game play ==
The game is extremely simple: listen for the tone, look for the light, hit the target. The game can be set at varying degrees of difficulty where the targets will stay on for as long as ten seconds down to as brief as 3/4ths of a second. The goal is for every player to have a positive experience with the game so that they will be encouraged to try again to beat their previous score. Patterns are random and the current, standard game will have only one target light on a tower at a time. The game scores accuracy (how many targets were hit before they "timed out") and reaction time.

== Sources ==
- The Makoto USA website (source for most details)
- MakotoCourt.com, a distributor (source for the "Paycheck" reference)
- US Patent #5,271,627, for a "real encounter game for balancing the body, mind and spirit"; i.e., Makoto. (Source for date of invention.)
