= The Great Ace Attorney Chronicles =

2021 compilation video game

- North American box art
- Developer: Capcom
- Publisher: Capcom
- Director: Masakazu Kougou (Note: Original games directed by Shu Takumi)
- Producers: Yasuyuki Makino; Daizo Nonaka
- Designer: Masakazu Kougou
- Programmer: Yuta Taki
- Artist: Kazuya Nuri
- Composer: Yasumasa Kitagawa
- Series: Ace Attorney
- Engine: MT Framework
- Platforms: Nintendo Switch; PlayStation 4; Windows
- Release: WW: July 27, 2021; JP: July 29, 2021
- Genres: Adventure, visual novel
- Mode: Single-player

The Great Ace Attorney Chronicles is a 2021 compilation video game of both games in the Ace Attorney spin-off prequel series, consisting of The Great Ace Attorney: Adventures (2015) and The Great Ace Attorney 2: Resolve (2017). Since both component games were released only in Japan, The Great Ace Attorney Chronicles is the first release of the series for other countries.

== Development ==
Head localizer Janet Hsu approached the localization of The Great Ace Attorney Chronicles primarily "as a story", like all other Ace Attorney titles. For The Great Ace Attorney Chronicles in particular, there was also a need for historical and cultural background research on which to base the translation. They wanted to preserve the "period feel" of the setting. An example of these extra considerations is the Court Record subtitle system where, in an effort to preserve the flavor of the Meiji Japan setting, they asked the programmers to create a new UI system with which they could add subtitles to pieces of evidence instead of redoing the textures in English.

Unlike in previous Ace Attorney localizations, few of the Japanese cultural nuances were altered. This was because the game distinctly relied on the contrast between the cultures of Japan and Britain in its story and theming. However, some instances were "fine-tuned" regarding their phrasing, in order to help bring out the intended nuance of the original. Hsu states one example of this with the character Susato Mikotoba. Hsu wanted to make sure Western players understood that Susato is not being deferential or asking for permission, but is following Japanese etiquette. Hsu found it difficult to translate over the games numerous jokes and conversions that would not make sense to a Western audience. For example, a conversation between Ryunosuke and Susato about a snowman involved them talking about how something is "two heads" or "three heads" high. This had to be changed, as it relied on players being aware of the culture surrounding daruma dolls and would not come across as funny in English. To maintain the feel of the original while altering such lines, Hsu considered what the Japanese version was going for and to either translate it over direct if possible, or go for its nearest approximation. In the original, dialogue consists of "faux-Meiji Era" style Japanese which is of the period, yet which is still easy to understand for modern audiences. To replicate this, the localization has the British characters speak in "faux-Victorian" dialect, such as the blue-collar Cockney accent of Gina Lestrade.

The increase in awareness of Japanese culture in recent years allowed Hsu to include Japanese honorifics into the game without needing to explain what they mean. The usage of "-san" and "-sama", in contrast with English honorifics like "Mister" and "Miss", was utilized in order to subtly convey to players when Ryunosuke and Susato are supposed to be speaking Japanese to each other.

As the story and themes of The Great Ace Attorney are heavily tied to the protagonist being Japanese, Hsu felt it was important to convey his immigrant experience. The main struggle they faced was conveying cultural information to players in a way that feels natural. This was a stark contrast to past Ace Attorney localizations, in which the setting was altered to America. Hsu gives the comparison of "Turnabout Storyteller" from Spirit of Justice, in which rakugo played a major role. Hsu notes that, as the protagonist is localized to be American, having Japanese culture explained to her for the player's sake was easily doable and made sense. However, in contrast, it would seem entirely unnatural if Ryunosuke had to have Japanese culture explained to him. Thusly they needed to rely on slipping the information to the player naturally via context clues and indirect dialogue. Prior to announcement of the game's Western localization, fears over the game's usage of racism directed toward Ryunosuke and other Japanese characters was one of the speculated reasons for the lack of a Western release.

Conveying British culture to American audiences was also another hurdle that Hsu faced. There were issues involving the differing terminology between British English and American English, such as "first floor" meaning different things in both. The Japanese original also contained many references to Victorian Britain that even the British translators did not know about, and had to look up. Hsu avoided using obscure Victorian Era-words or hardcore "Britishisms" that would have been confusing to people unfamiliar with the terms. Regarding the British setting, as the Japanese original takes great care to make the London setting feel real, Hsu avoided leaning on "American ideas of a stereotypical England", and instead focused on celebrating the culture of Britain. To this extent, most of the translators who worked on the game were British, and the translation was handed by Plus Alpha Translations.

The inclusion of real-life figure Natsume Sōseki caused another hurdle for Hsu. As Natsume would be recognizable to all Japanese players, his books being required learning at school, the character relied a great deal on a natural cultural warmth towards him. It was difficult making the character as lovable to an audience who would likely not know who he is.

Due to long-standing copyright issues related to the character of Sherlock Holmes with the estate of Sir Arthur Conan Doyle, which had previously delayed the game's release, the character of Sherlock was renamed "Herlock Sholmes" for the international release. This was done as an allusion to Maurice Leblanc's Arsène Lupin versus Herlock Sholmes, according to Takumi. Following the announcement of the "Herlock Sholmes" localization, memes developed around the character and the circumstances of his renaming from "Sherlock Holmes" in conjunction with copyright law. This situation was picked up and covered by major online news outlets. Comic Book Resources lauded the "goofy moniker" of the character, complimenting its "fit with the comedic and sometimes irreverent tone of the Ace Attorney series, even if it does leave a few things lost in translation."

== Release ==
Following the existence of the localization being leaked in February 2021, Capcom officially announced The Great Ace Attorney Chronicles in April 2021, a bundle containing both Adventures and Resolve, which then released on July 27, 2021 for Nintendo Switch, PlayStation 4, and Windows. This version includes both English and Japanese audio tracks, an auto-advancing story mode, all the downloadable episodes and costumes from both games, and an in-game gallery for viewing artwork, trailers, and music. Players that pre-ordered the compilation or purchased it before September 1, 2021 received the "From the Vaults" downloadable content, which adds additional art and music to the gallery.

== Reception ==
Reception

Aggregate score
Aggregator	Score
Metacritic	NS: 86/100; PC: 83/100; PS4: 82/100

Review scores
Publication	Score
Adventure Gamers	5/5
Computer Games Magazine	8.5/10
Destructoid	9/10
Game Informer	8.25/10
GameSpot	8/10
Hardcore Gamer	4.5/5
Jeuxvideo.com	16/20
Nintendo Life	9/10
Nintendo World Report	9.5/10
PC Gamer (US)	73/100
Push Square	8/10
RPGFan	90/100
Shacknews	9/10
The Guardian	5/5
VideoGamer.com	7/10

The Great Ace Attorney Chronicles received "generally favorable reviews" according to review aggregator Metacritic.

Kimberley Wallace of Game Informer considered the game "an entertaining package with two closely connected games that delight in their over-the-top fashion". Andrew King of GameSpot wrote that the story of the two games was "impressively cohesive", well written and with memorable characters, though a bit slow-paced, and also found the new "summation examination" mechanic incredibly funny. Ash Parrish of Kotaku praised the various additions that have been made to the gameplay, such as the Story Mode function or the new "Dances of Deductions", but also felt that the game was too long and slowly-paced, and that the racism the Japanese characters deal with in the story was "a little over the top". Kate Gray of Nintendo Life felt the localisation work made for the Western release was "fantastic", and also praised the soundtrack and the roster of characters, though lamenting the cast's small size and repetition. Malindy Hetfeld at Eurogamer noted that the game suffered from being compared to the original trilogy, but also stated that it tried something new both with the setting and the gameplay, praising Shu Takumi's writing. Graham Russel of Siliconera, while considering the game fun, stated that the core gameplay of the series needed more substantial updates, as the title played very similarly to its predecessors despite the presence of some new gimmicks. Eric Van Allen of Destructoid praised the deduction system and wrote that it "blend[ed] in naturally with the gameplay" and that it "emphasize[d] Naruhodo's growing ability to deduce and discover the truth..." Rachel Watts of PC Gamer scored the game a 73 of 100, praising the setting and atmosphere while writing that the hands-on deductions in the game contributed to a "missed feeling of showing up to court with a bag full of evidence" that this left "no sense of build-up to the trial." Patrick Lum of The Guardian called the game the "best game in the franchise," praising the "eccentric and entertaining witnesses" while calling its writing "truly sublime." Stephen Tailby of Push Square praised its gameplay, story, characters, setting, presentation, and bonus content, while criticizing its slow pacing and rudimentary new additions.

Entertainment Weekly placed The Great Ace Attorney Chronicles on the list of the Year's Best + Worst in the "Play" section for "Best Use of Vintage Copyright Avoidance", saying, "Herlock Sholmes is totally legally distinct from Sherlock Holmes. Just ask Arsène Lupin."

The Great Ace Attorney Chronicles was nominated for the Freedom Tower Award for Best Remake at New York Videogame Critics Circle's 11th Annual New York Game Awards, which went to Resident Evil 4 VR. The game won the award for Best Story in the Editors' Choice section, but was a runner-up for the same category in the Readers' Choice section at Adventure Gamers' 2021 Aggie Awards; it was also a runner-up for Best Writing - Drama in the Editors' Choice section, for Best Graphics Design and Best Sound Effects in the Readers' Choice section, and for Best Music in the Editors' Choice section while winning the same category in Readers' Choice, and was a runner-up for Best Non-Traditional Adventure and Overall Best Adventure of 2021 in both Editors' and Readers' Choice. By April 14, 2022, The Great Ace Attorney Chronicles had sold 500,000 units worldwide. By March 31, 2024, it had sold over one million units.
