= Godot (Ace Attorney) =

Ace Attorney character

- Ace Attorney character
- Godot in Phoenix Wright: Ace Attorney Trilogy
- First game: Phoenix Wright: Ace Attorney – Trials and Tribulations (2004)
- Created by: Shu Takumi
- Designed by: Tatsurō Iwamoto
- Voiced by: Japanese: Hideki Kamiya (game); Hiroaki Hirata (anime); English: James C. Wilson (game); Brandon Potter (anime)

In-universe information
- Full name: Diego Armando
- Occupation: Prosecutor, former Defense attorney

Godot (Japanese: ゴドー, Hepburn: Godō) is a character in the 2004 video game Phoenix Wright: Ace Attorney – Trials and Tribulations. He is a prosecutor who faces off against protagonist and defense attorney Phoenix Wright, whom he bears a bitterness towards and refers to as "Mr. Trite." He wears a mask with a red visor and drinks coffee abundantly. His true identity is that of Diego Armando (Note: Japanese: 神乃木荘龍; lit. Sōryū Kaminogi), a former lover and co-worker of Mia Fey, and he holds a grudge against Phoenix due to his failure to protect her, and seeks revenge against Dahlia Hawthorne for putting him in a coma.

He was created by Shu Takumi and designed by Tatsurō Iwamoto, both of whom considering him their favorite character. The first details of the character were that he wore a mask and had white hair, with the mask playing into the conclusion of Godot's mystery. Iwamoto based him on multiple characters, including Roy Batty from the film Blade Runner. His theme, "Fragrance of Dark Coffee," was composed by Noriyuki Iwadare, who created a song that he felt evoked a jazz cafe after learning about Godot's interest in coffee. He was voiced by Hideki Kamiya, who aspired to voice a character in the series as early as Justice for All. Godot has received generally positive reception, identified as one of the most popular characters in the series, with one writer believing that his philosophy and quotations contributed to this popularity. His theme song was a popular one, often played at concerts and live performances for the series.

== Appearances ==
Godot first appears in Phoenix Wright: Ace Attorney – Trials and Tribulations as a prosecutor and rival to protagonist Phoenix Wright. He holds a bitterness towards Phoenix and refers to him as "Mr. Trite." His real name is Diego Armando, a former defense attorney and associate of Phoenix's late mentor, Mia Fey. He blames Phoenix for failing to protect her. Godot was in a coma at the time due to being poisoned by Dahlia Hawthorne, the murderer of Mia's first trial who Mia failed to convict. When he awoke, he discovered a plot to kill Mia's sister, Maya Fey, involving the channeling of Dahlia's ghost. Godot intervened with Mia and Maya's mother, Misty Fey, to stop it. On the planned day of the murder, Misty channeled Dahlia's spirit, and Godot killed Misty. His involvement in Misty's killing was ultimately proven by Phoenix, earning Godot's respect.

== Concept and creation ==
Godot was created by Shu Takumi, who identified Godot as his favorite character. Godot was originally meant to drink bourbon whiskey and smoke cigarettes in order to match his "hard-boiled" image, but this was changed to coffee due to concerns that this could be a bad influence on kids. When designing Godot's role in the story, Takumi always meant for him to be the final villain, with the design of his red mask coming before this and inspiring the direction of the confrontation between Phoenix and Godot. Godot's theme, "Fragrance of Dark Coffee," was composed by Noriyuki Iwadare. He chose to make it similar to the kind of song a person would hear at a jazz cafe after hearing coffee mentioned in relation to Godot, feeling that a coffee shop would suit Godot well.

Godot was designed by Tatsurō Iwamoto, who considered him his favorite character design he created. Godot came from the idea of having a character wear a mask. When he was first instructed to design the character, the parameters involved only that he wear a mask and have white hair. In designing Godot, he aimed to make a "cool older brother" type of character, basing his design on multiple other designs, including Roy Batty from the film Blade Runner and Koji Sato from the film Black Rain. He stated that the visor was his favorite mecha anime, and that he took everyone he really admired and combined them into Godot, which was what made him feel so connected to Godot. He was excited while drawing Godot, thinking he was such a cool character, particularly enjoying the idea of having coffee slide in from off-screen. Due to a scene of Manfred von Karma, a character from Phoenix Wright: Ace Attorney, talking about having a granddaughter, and Franziska being a daughter to him, he speculated she must have an older brother or sister. This led to him labeling Godot as Franziska's older brother, but Takumi ignored this.

Godot is voiced in Japanese by Hideki Kamiya. Kamiya, being a fan of the series, wanted to voice a character in the second game, being given the role of Godot in Trials and Tribulations. During recording, Kamiya was told by Takumi that he was a hard-boiled kind of character. Kamiya tried to adapt the dialogue to say "objection, baby!" from this; Takumi liked the take, but due to it not fitting on screen, they couldn't use it.

== Reception ==
Godot has received generally positive reception, recognized as among the most popular characters in the series by Real Sound staff. Famitsu writer Kawachi felt that he was a particularly unforgettable character, stating that he felt both mysterious and imposing. He felt that players would become even more enamored with him after learning his true identity. Den Fami Nico Gamer writer Duckhead felt that Godot was a more popular character than Phoenix, himself preferring Godot. Anime News Network writer Rebecca Silverman felt that while Godot's true identity was not hard to figure out, his motivations made him more well-rounded, feeling that he was not a "textbook villain." She also praised his English voice performance, stating that voice actor Brandon Potter has "just the right amount of smarm." IT Media staff interviewed a lawyer who spent years aspiring to be one after playing Ace Attorney. In this interview, the lawyer, Nezzu, stated that he found Godot to be a cool character who influenced him, particularly in his enjoyment of extra-strong black coffee.

Godot's theme song, "The Fragrance of Dark Coffee," has received positive reception, and is often used at Ace Attorney concerts and live performances. Hardcore Gamer writer Geoff Thew felt it was among the best songs in the series, discussing how cool Godot was, and how he played the song was his favorite to listen to while writing. Game Watch writer Kazuo Ishida felt that Godot had among the most memorable lines in the series and that he was arguably the best character in Trials and Tribulations. Video Game Music Online writer Oliver Jia enjoyed the arrangement of his theme in the album "Ace Attorney Meets Again -Orchestra & Jazz-," praising its saxophone melody and the backing provided by "romantic strings." He felt that the Tokyo Philharmonic version was better, but that they were both essential tracks. Inside Games writer Kamex found the song, when performed at the Ace Attorney 20th Anniversary Concert, overwhelmingly relaxing, appreciating the saxophone performance.
