= Phoenix Wright: Ace Attorney – Trials and Tribulations =

2004 video game

- North American Nintendo DS box art featuring (from left to right) Godot, Mia Fey, Phoenix Wright, and Maya Fey
- Developer: Capcom Production Studio 4
- Publisher: Capcom
- Director: Shu Takumi
- Producer: Atsushi Inaba
- Programmer: Hiroyuki Kudo
- Artist: Tatsuro Iwamoto
- Writer: Shu Takumi
- Composer: Noriyuki Iwadare
- Series: Ace Attorney
- Platforms: Game Boy Advance, Windows, Nintendo DS, Wii
- Release: Game Boy Advance: JP: January 23, 2004; Windows: JP: March 31, 2006; Nintendo DS: JP: August 23, 2007; NA: October 23, 2007; EU: October 3, 2008; Wii: JP: February 23, 2010; NA: May 10, 2010; EU: May 21, 2010
- Genres: Visual novel, adventure
- Mode: Single-player

Phoenix Wright: Ace Attorney – Trials and Tribulations (Note: Known in Japan as Gyakuten Saiban 3 (Japanese: 逆転裁判3; lit. Turnabout Trial 3)) is a visual novel adventure video game developed and published by Capcom. It was originally released for the Game Boy Advance in 2004 in Japan, and has since been released for several platforms, including a Nintendo DS version that was released in 2007 in Japan and North America and in 2008 in Europe. It is the third game in the Ace Attorney series, following Phoenix Wright: Ace Attorney (2001) and Justice for All (2002).

The story follows defense attorneys Phoenix Wright and Mia Fey, who defend their clients in five episodes. Among other characters are Phoenix's assistant and Mia's sister Maya, her cousin Pearl, and prosecutor Godot. The gameplay is split into courtroom sections, where the player cross-examines witnesses and tries to discover contradictions in their testimonies, and investigations, where they gather evidence and talk to witnesses.

The game was directed and written by Shu Takumi as the last game in an Ace Attorney trilogy; he also wanted it to be the final entry in the series, as he felt he had explored Phoenix's character fully. Because he was satisfied with the gameplay in Justice for All, he did not introduce any new gameplay mechanics in Trials and Tribulations. Flashbacks were used as a major theme in the game; this originated in Takumi trying to come up with a way of handling dialogue-integrated tutorials, and deciding to use a flashback to a case from when Mia was a rookie attorney.

The game has received generally favorable reviews, with reviewers liking the story, writing, character designs and music, but with some criticizing the lack of new gameplay mechanics. Additionally, the Wii version was criticized for using resized graphics from the Nintendo DS version, without any modifications to make them appear better on a larger screen. The Nintendo DS version was a commercial success in North America, with pre-orders being more than double the amount Capcom had estimated.

A high-definition version of the first three Ace Attorney games, Phoenix Wright: Ace Attorney Trilogy HD, (Note: Known in Japan as Gyakuten Saiban 123HD: Naruhodō Ryūichi (逆転裁判 123HD 〜成歩堂 龍一編〜, lit. Turnabout Trial 123HD: Ryūichi Naruhodō)) was released for iOS and Android in Japan on February 7, 2012, and for iOS in the West on May 30, 2013. Another collection of the first three games, Phoenix Wright: Ace Attorney Trilogy, (Note: Known in Japan as Gyakuten Saiban 123: Naruhodō Selection (逆転裁判123 成歩堂セレクション, lit. Turnabout Trial 123: Naruhodō Selection)) was released for the Nintendo 3DS in Japan on April 17, 2014, in North America on December 9, 2014, and in Europe on December 11, 2014. It was also released for Nintendo Switch, PlayStation 4, and Xbox One on February 21, 2019, in Japan, and on April 9, 2019, internationally; a Windows version was released internationally on the same date. The PC version of the collection was among the best-selling new releases of the month on Steam. (Note: Based on total revenue for the first two weeks on sale.)

== Gameplay ==
Trials and Tribulations is a visual novel adventure game in which the player takes the roles of Phoenix Wright and Mia Fey, defense attorneys who defend their clients in five different episodes. The gameplay remains unchanged from Justice for All, the previous title in the series.

From the start, only one episode is available to play; when the player completes an episode, a new one is unlocked. The episodes are divided into chapters, which consist of investigations and courtroom sessions. During investigation sections, the player aims to find evidence for use in the courtroom sessions; the game moves on to the next chapter within the episode when the player has gathered enough evidence. The player moves and performs actions through a menu with four options: "examine", which lets them move a cursor over the environment and examine items; "move", which shows a menu with locations the player can move to; talk, which shows a list of topics the player can discuss with witnesses in the area; and present, which lets the player show evidence or character profiles to a witness. Some witnesses do not want to discuss certain subjects, leading to a lock symbol appearing over the subject. By showing the witness a magatama, the player is able to see the secret they are trying to hide in the form of locks, called a "Psyche-Lock"; by presenting correct evidence or character profiles, the player can break the locks and be able to discuss the subject.

During the courtroom sections, the player defends their client and cross-examines the witnesses. They can move back and forth between the statements in each testimony; if they find a contradiction between a statement and the evidence, they can point out the contradiction by presenting a relevant piece of evidence or character profile. The player can also choose to question a statement, which sometimes leads to changes in the testimony. A life bar, representing the judge's patience, is shown in the upper right corner of the screen. If the player presents incorrect evidence or profiles, the bar will decrease; if it reaches zero, the player loses and their client is declared guilty. The bar will also decrease if the player makes mistakes while trying to break psyche-locks; however, the player cannot lose while trying to break psyche-locks. 50% of the life bar gets restored when the player manages to break a psyche-lock, and it gets fully restored when the player completes an episode.

== Plot ==
=== Setting and characters ===
Trials and Tribulations is primarily set one year after the events of the previous game, and focuses on the career of defense attorney Phoenix Wright, though certain segments are set five or more years earlier and follow his deceased mentor, Mia Fey. Other featured characters include Maya Fey, Mia's sister and a spirit medium who acts as Phoenix's secretary and assistant, and her young cousin Pearl Fey. After Mia was killed during the events of Phoenix Wright: Ace Attorney; Phoenix took over her law practice. Nevertheless, he regularly consults with her on cases by having either Maya or Pearl channel her spirit, which allows them to assume her appearance. Phoenix also occasionally receives help from prosecutors Miles Edgeworth and Franziska von Karma as well as Detective Dick Gumshoe, who hold him in high regard. The game's featured antagonist is Godot, an eccentric, coffee-loving prosecutor who keeps his identity concealed behind a mask and who seems to harbor a personal grudge against Phoenix.

=== Story ===
In her first trial, rookie attorney Mia Fey and her co-counsel Diego Armando defend death row inmate Terry Fawles, who is accused of murdering policewoman Valerie Hawthorne during an escape attempt. Facing off against rookie prosecutor Miles Edgeworth, also in his first trial, Mia discovers that five years earlier, Terry, Valerie, and her younger sister Dahlia staged a kidnapping to steal a jewel from the girls' father. To keep the jewel for themselves, Dahlia and Valerie betrayed Terry by faking Dahlia's death, leaving Terry to be convicted of her murder based on Valerie's testimony. Terry escaped in the hopes of learning the truth from Valerie, but when Dahlia learnt this, she killed Valerie to prevent her confession. Before a judgement can be passed, Terry commits suicide by consuming poison received from Dahlia years earlier, ending the trial without resolution. Dahlia subsequently poisons Armando after learning he was investigating her further, leaving him comatose, and begins dating university student Phoenix Wright after giving him the necklace she used to carry the poison. Months later, Phoenix is charged with the murder of fellow student Doug Swallow. Mia, acting as his lawyer, exposes Dahlia as both Swallow's killer and Armando's assailant. She was also planning to kill Phoenix to get back the necklace. Dahlia is arrested, convicted, and sentenced to death. Despite this, Phoenix believes his girlfriend "Dollie" to be innocent.

Five years later, Phoenix represents Ron DeLite in court after he is accused of theft, facing off against the mysterious prosecutor Godot. Although Phoenix indicts private detective Luke Atmey as the thief, Ron is subsequently arrested for the murder of his former boss Kane Bullard, based on evidence Phoenix presented in his defense. At the last second, Phoenix manages to identify Atmey as Bullard's murderer, having realized Atmey framed Ron so he could use double jeopardy to escape punishment. Months later, Phoenix is informed he supposedly failed to properly defend former client Maggey Byrde against accusations of poisoning programmer Glen Elg. Realizing someone impersonated him, Phoenix secures a retrial and conducts his own investigation, discovering that Elg was developing a computer virus on behalf of loan shark Furio Tigre, who bears a resemblance to Phoenix. He deduces that Tigre killed Elg to steal the virus, needing money urgently to repay a large debt to a mob boss, before framing Maggey and posing as Wright to ensure her conviction. Despite no decisive evidence, Phoenix manages to get Tigre arrested by tricking him into identifying the bottle of poison used in the murder, exposing himself as the killer.

During a visit to a mountain retreat with Maya and Pearl Fey, Phoenix discovers the corpse of author Elise Deauxnim. While looking for Maya, he falls into a river and becomes ill, looking over Mia's first two cases during his recovery. With Phoenix incapacitated and Godot missing, prosecutors Edgeworth and Franziska von Karma are forced to temporarily fill in as defense and prosecutor respectively for the trial of Phoenix's client, a nun called Iris who resembles Dahlia. When Phoenix returns, he discovers that Elise was really Maya's long-lost mother, Misty Fey, and her death was the result of a plan engineered by her sister Morgan to kill Maya with help from the deceased Dahlia, revealed to be Morgan's daughter and Iris's twin sister. Through cross-examination, Phoenix reveals that not only is Dahlia impersonating Iris, but she is being channeled through Maya's body to do so. With Mia's help, Dahlia is exorcised from Maya, and the trial continues. Phoenix finally deduces that Godot, revealed to be Diego Armando, killed Misty, who was channeling Dahlia at the time, to protect Maya. Having spent his time since awakening blaming Phoenix for Mia's death, he concedes that Phoenix is worthy as her successor. Iris is arrested again as Armando's accomplice in Misty's murder, but reveals to Phoenix that it was her he had dated in college, as she posed as Dahlia to try to protect him from her sister by getting back the necklace peacefully, eventually falling in love with him before Dahlia grew impatient and tried to kill him. Phoenix thanks "Dollie" for being who he thought she was, then reunites with his friends.

== Development ==
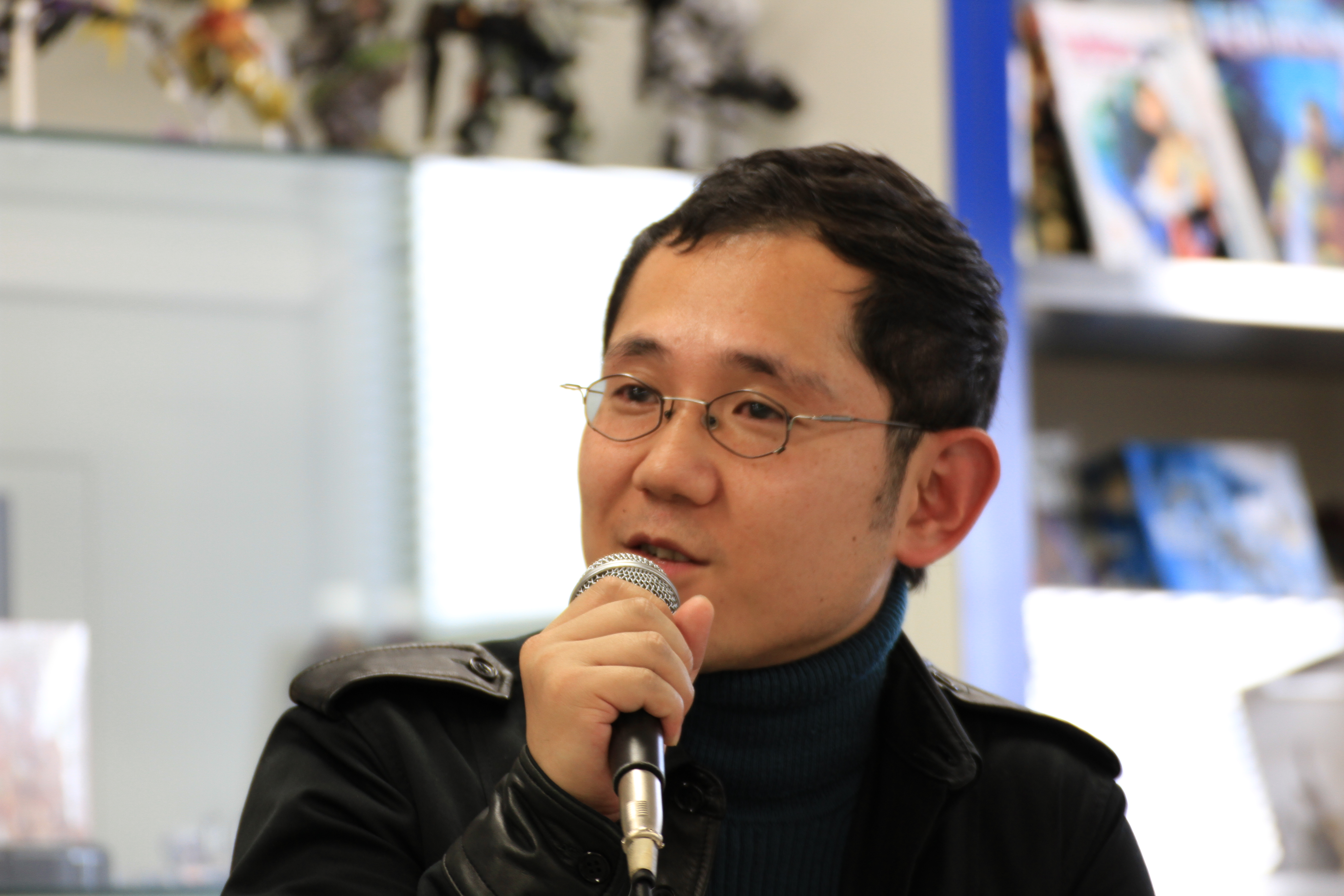
The game was directed and written by Shu Takumi.

Trials and Tribulations was written and directed by Shu Takumi, with art by Tatsuro Iwamoto and music by Noriyuki Iwadare. After development of the original Phoenix Wright: Ace Attorney was finished, Takumi's boss, Shinji Mikami, told him that they should make an Ace Attorney trilogy, with a grand finale in the third game's last case. Takumi wanted the three first Ace Attorney games to comprise three parts of a greater whole. Therefore, he avoided making a lot of changes: art for main characters such as Phoenix, Maya and Edgeworth was reused from the first game, to avoid having the previous games look outdated in comparison to newer games in the series; and no new gameplay mechanics were added for Trials and Tribulations, as Takumi was happy with the gameplay after having added the psyche-lock mechanic for Justice for All. He wanted the series to end with Trials and Tribulations, as he had explored Phoenix's character fully and wanted to avoid the series becoming "a shadow of its former self", saying that he thinks it is important to know when to end a story.

Because the dialogue-integrated tutorial in the first game had been well received, it was considered a major point for future games in the series. In the first game, Takumi had Phoenix being guided through his first trial by the judge and Mia, and for the second game, he had Phoenix suffer from amnesia; when writing the third game, Takumi did not know what to do, as it would not seem credible if Phoenix had amnesia a second time. Eventually he came up with the idea of using a flashback to a case where Mia had just become an attorney; he developed this idea further, and ended up using flashbacks as a major theme for the game's story. He decided that he wanted to include a case where Mia faces off against Edgeworth back when he was a rookie prosecutor, but encountered a problem: both characters had previously been established as never having lost a single case. Trying to come up with a way for a case in the past to work with neither of them winning or losing, he came up with the story for Terry Fawles, who dies during the trial. The game's main theme was "not everything is always what it seems on the surface".

During the game's development there was lots of requests by fans of the previous entries for a case that wasn't about murder, this led to Takumi writing "The Stolen Turnabout" which was a robbery case, Takumi thought up an idea for a scenario for an episode where the start and ending of a case had the player solving different crimes but Takumi felt that the execution of the idea wasn't as great as he had hoped. There were also requests for a case that revolved around groping on a packed train but Takumi and Inaba rejected the idea due to the case not being "fun", "hitting too close to home" and the evidence for the case wouldn't have fit within age restrictions.

The third episode of the game, "Recipe for Turnabout", was originally intended as the fourth episode of Justice for All but had been cut due to memory limitations. The game's fifth episode, "Bridge to the Turnabout", features a segment in which the player briefly controls Edgeworth. As Edgeworth had been a popular character ever since start of the series, Takumi found it difficult to come up with a way to bring him back without having him, a supposedly great prosecutor, always lose to Phoenix. While he was writing the story for the game's final case, he thought of the idea to have Edgeworth become a player character; he liked this idea so much that he immediately started to rewrite the case. In order to allow Edgeworth to be the player character, the first thing he did was to "get rid of" Phoenix by having him fall from a bridge into an icy river. He enjoyed writing from another character's perspective, who thought differently from Phoenix; he also used the case to explore the relationship between Edgeworth and Gumshoe. Takumi had also originally planned for every member of the Fey clan to be killed in "Bridge to the Turnabout", with Maya the only survivor, but this was later revised due to its excessive dark tone.

=== Hardware limitations and art direction ===
The development team had troubles fitting the entire game on a single Game Boy Advance cartridge: while they had the same amount of memory available as when they made the first Ace Attorney game, Trials and Tribulations was 2.3 times as large content-wise. To accomplish this, they made use of "tricks and workarounds" they had figured out since working on the first game: for instance, they worked to create better structures for storing data efficiently, better compression of the graphical data, and good sounds that only use little data. Takumi found these constraints fun, as it was a chance to improve the team's abilities and a source of inspiration for doing as much as possible within the memory limitations. They still ended up having to cut or change several features: along with the art of the younger Mia, Phoenix and Edgeworth in the flashback episodes, they had planned to have new art assets for a younger Gumshoe, with his tie tied tightly and with only one hair spike, but had to settle for giving him a new coat. The character Oldbag from the first game was first cut, then included as a cameo at the end when they realized that they had just enough space for her; Takumi wanted to have her wear a lei as she would have just come back from a Hawaii trip, but was unable to due to memory limitations. Due to miscalculations of the game asset size, they had to make the character Bikini shorter in order to save some memory.

After all text was written, the development team decided which scenes should have illustrations made for them; Takumi drew rough sketches of these. He also drew the storyboards for the episodes' openings. While episode openings in previous Ace Attorney games consisted of series of illustrations, the development team decided to change to make use of a "more animated and dramatic presentation" in Trials and Tribulations: by using moving graphics on top of still images, they were still able to limit the amount of data used. The first opening they did was for episode 2; it used animation a lot, and was liked by the development team, inspiring Takumi to make even better openings for the rest of the episodes and leading the team to think of movie effects that could be used. For one opening, they gave it a "vintage movie feel": by setting the color palette to monochrome, they were able to limit the color data.

The character Grossberg's design was changed for Trials and Tribulations, with his brown suit changed to a red one: this was because the Game Boy Advance system's screen made his previous design blend in too much with the brown courtroom. Iwamoto based the design of Godot on Rutger Hauer's role in Blade Runner. He was originally going to be depicted as drinking bourbon whiskey and smoking, as part of his "hard-boiled" image; when the development team realized that this could have a bad influence on children, they made him drink coffee instead. As Takumi and Hideki Kamiya had joined Capcom around the same time and had desks near each other, Kamiya had asked Takumi for a voice role ever since the development of Justice for All; eventually, Takumi gave him the role of Godot. Takumi explained the role as a hard-boiled guy, so Kamiya decided to adapt the dialogue and shout "Objection, baby!". Takumi said that it was a good take, but that the in-game graphics just say "Objection!", so it could not be used.

== Release ==
The game was originally released for the Game Boy Advance on January 23, 2004, in Japan; a Windows version followed on March 31, 2006, also in Japan. A Nintendo DS version was released on August 23, 2007, in Japan, on October 23, 2007, in North America, and on October 3, 2008, in Europe. It was released for the Wii via WiiWare on February 23, 2010, in Japan, on May 10, 2010, in North America, and on May 21, 2010, in Europe.

=== Localization ===
The localization of Trials and Tribulations was directed by Janet Hsu, with editing help from fellow localization director Andrew Alfonso. They changed several character names for the localization: Dahlia Hawthorne's English name came from the X Japan album Dahlia (1996), which Hsu was listening to at the time of the localization, as well as the short story "Rappaccini's Daughter". Her nickname, Dollie, was a reference to an attempted fan translation of Trials and Tribulations, in which she was nicknamed Dolly. Among the initial ideas for Diego Armando's name were Joseph Cuppa, Xavier Barstucks, and William Havamug. Luke Atmey's catchphrase, rendered as "Zuvari" (ズヴァリ) in the Japanese version, was going to be changed to "Schwing!" at one point; Hsu eventually changed it to "Zvarri!", as she found it "catchy and eccentric like Atmey himself". Because Alfonso, who is from Canada, wanted to "show his Maple Pride", it was decided to make the judge's brother a Canadian.

The localization team faced some issues when localizing the character Jean Armstrong: in the Japanese version, he is portrayed as an okama character, which at the time of the game's development was a general word for effeminate men, often implying homosexuality, but also used for biologically male persons who do drag or speak like women, regardless of their sexuality and gender, and even including trans women. Because of this, they only had a vague concept of "gay", and had to make it understandable for English-speaking players. Hsu looked through all information that is given about Jean in the game, and came to the conclusion that he is a gay cis man who likes to perform non-passing drag. Looking back at the game in 2014, Hsu said that she still thought Jean caused confusion due to the general public having a less informed and nuanced understanding of gender and sexuality at the time of the game's release.

== Reception ==
Reception

Aggregate score
| Aggregator | Score |
|---|---|
| Metacritic | 81/100 (DS); 67/100 (Wii) |

Review scores
| Publication | Score |
|---|---|
| 1Up.com | A |
| Eurogamer | 8/10 |
| Famitsu | 35/40 |
| GameSpot | 7.5/10 |
| IGN | 7.7/10 |
| Nintendo World Report | 9/10 |

Trials and Tribulations has received generally favorable reviews for the Nintendo DS, holding a score of 81/100 based on 45 reviews at the review aggregator Metacritic; meanwhile, the Wii version holds a Metacritic score of 67/100 based on 9 reviews, indicating mixed or average reviews. The North American Nintendo DS release was a success, with pre-orders more than double of Capcom's estimates, resulting in a shortage of it at both retailers and at Capcom's own online store. In 2010, IGN ranked the game as the 23rd best video game for the Nintendo DS, praising it for its writing and for being an evolution of the point-and-click adventure genre.

Reviewers at Famitsu liked the game's story. Ryan Scott at 1UP.com called it "a perfect storm of everything that makes graphic adventures work", saying that it was apparent throughout the game that it had been created with a cohesive plot in mind, something he noted as a contrast to the previous games' more episodic approach. John Walker at Eurogamer said that the plot was the darkest and most complex in the Ace Attorney series, but also the funniest. He called the dialogue "consistently wonderful", and liked how Maya was given a bigger role than in Justice for All, with her often taking the lead during conversations with other characters. Aaron Thomas at GameSpot found the cases interesting and the writing "top-notch", with the dialogue feeling natural and well written; he did, however, think that the new characters, except for Godot and Dahlia Hawthorne, were annoying or not developed well. Colin Moriarty at IGN liked how the game's cases fit together, and enjoyed learning more about returning characters from the previous games, but wished the game had been less linear. Michael Cole at Nintendo World Report enjoyed how the story makes use of "brilliant twists of dramatic irony" by presenting the cases in a non-chronological order, and called it a "satisfying closure" for the series.

Scott noted that it was easier to reach correct puzzle solutions, with clues being given out "at a very reasonable rate". He saw this as the game's largest improvement upon previous Ace Attorney titles, which he said relied on trial and error; he had considered this the weakest point in the series, and something that needed to be changed. On the other hand, Walker said that the player often can figure out what a contradiction is going to be before the game lets them prove it, and the player might come up with legitimate ideas that the game does not accept. He also wished that the life bar could be filled up in court. Cole criticized how relevant evidence sometimes is not accepted, and how testimony statements sometimes need to be pressed in a certain order, but appreciated the game's larger focus on courtroom sessions over investigations. Thomas and the reviewers at Famitsu criticized the lack of new gameplay features, although the former thought that fans of the series would be fine with it. Scott acknowledged that the gameplay only is what is expected from the series, but did not find a problem with it due to the focus on narrative over gameplay. Moriarty said that while Trials and Tribulations is a good game in its own right, he wished that Capcom would make some changes to the gameplay or presentation, to avoid the series becoming "overdone, played-out, and tired".

Thomas liked the visuals, saying that the game was capable of conveying characters' moods instantly despite being limited to only a few frames of animation, and that the backgrounds were nice and fitting in well with the ones from returning locations; he did however dislike how a lot of the artwork was reused from previous Ace Attorney games. Cole and Moriarty were not bothered by the limited character sprites and animation or static backgrounds; Cole called the character designs "memorable and hilariously animated", while Moriarty, who liked both, said that the characters looked "awesome". Thomas called the game's music outstanding, saying that the intense music that plays at high-stakes moments during trials, as well as the character themes, all fit well. Cole said that the courtroom and character themes were memorable and fitting; he called them improvements over their counterparts in Justice for All, and "at least on par with" those in Phoenix Wright: Ace Attorney. Moriarty said that the music "set the mood perfectly" for each scene.

=== Wii version ===
Corbie Dillard at Nintendo Life criticized the Wii version for using resized graphics from the Nintendo DS version without doing any "touch-ups", resulting in a pixelated look. He also disliked the Wii Remote-based gameplay changes, saying that they were annoying for people who have already played the portable versions of the game. Lucas M. Thomas at IGN also found it disappointing how the graphics, audio and content had not been changed at all compared to the Nintendo DS release, saying that the visuals did not look attractive when resized to fit a larger screen; he concluded that it did not seem like the Wii version had been given "any extra love and attention at all". Marissa Meli at GameZone called it a "3/10 interpretation of a 9/10 title", saying that the pixelated graphics made the game look ugly and shoddy.
