= Maya Fey =

Fictional spirit medium and legal assistant

- Ace Attorney character
- Maya Fey in Phoenix Wright: Ace Attorney Trilogy
- First game: Phoenix Wright: Ace Attorney (2001)
- Created by: Shu Takumi
- Designed by: Tatsurō Iwamoto
- Voiced by: English: Samantha Dakin (Professor Layton vs. Ace Attorney); Abby Trott (Spirit of Justice); Lindsay Seidel (anime); Japanese: Mirei Kiritani (Professor Layton vs. Ace Attorney); Satomi Hanamura (Spirit of Justice, Project X Zone 2); Aoi Yūki (anime)
- Portrayed by: Mirei Kiritani (film); Rei Sumireno (musicals); Reno Nakamura (stage plays)

In-universe information
- Occupation: Spirit Medium
- Family: Misty Fey (mother); Mia Fey (sister); Morgan Fey (aunt); Dahlia Hawthorne (cousin); Iris (cousin); Pearl Fey (cousin)
- Relatives: Ami Fey (ancestor)

Maya Fey, known as Mayoi Ayasato (Japanese: 綾里 真宵, Hepburn: Ayasato Mayoi) in the original Japanese language versions, is a fictional spirit medium in Ace Attorney, a visual novel adventure video game series created by Japanese company Capcom. Maya is featured as the main support character to the protagonist Phoenix Wright in the first three games of the series and later returns in the sixth game. The character has also appeared in film, anime and manga adaptations of the series, a Japanese series of musicals and stage plays, and crossover video games such as Moe Moe No Limit Off Beat Action Shooting (2004) Ultimate Marvel vs. Capcom 3 (2011) Professor Layton vs. Phoenix Wright: Ace Attorney (2012) and Project X Zone 2 (2015).

Maya was created by Shu Takumi, the creator and director of the series, as he wanted the player character to have a partner to investigate with. For her design, she was given traditional clothing for Japanese spirit mediums, including a kimono and a magatama bead. When she was brought back for Spirit of Justice, she was at first written the same way as in her first appearances, but was then changed to be more mature at some points, to show that she had grown during the nine years that had passed within the games' story. Critics praised her character and her interactions with Phoenix, and her return in Spirit of Justice was well received, but her portrayal in the Ace Attorney film and stage plays was criticized as off compared to her video game appearances.

== Concept and development ==
Ace Attorney series creator and director Shu Takumi created Maya as a partner for Phoenix in order to make cases more fun to investigate by offering advice. While she was planned to be a partner from the start, she was initially planned to be a lawyer-in-training. For Spirit of Justice, it was decided early on to bring Maya back, due to frequent requests for her return from Dual Destinies players. The developers worried a lot about how she would be received, with the game's producer Motohide Eshiro saying that they were certain that people would criticize the use of the character regardless of what they did. At first she was written with the concept of having grown into an adult but still remaining the same inside; the game's director and writer, Takeshi Yamazaki, thought that this unchanged personality felt strange considering nine years had passed within the series' story since her last appearance, so it was decided to at some points have her act more maturely, to show that she had grown. To further this, her mastery of spirit channeling was written as improved compared to her last appearance. Yamazaki had problems with writing her dialogue, and said that he had to try his best to get her to sound right. They also had problems with getting the balance right between Maya's involvement in the story and the appearances of other characters; because of this, they decided to make her the defendant of the game's third case, thereby freeing up space for other characters during the investigation phase, and letting the player spend time with Maya during the trial itself. Takumi considers Maya and Phoenix as his favourite characters in the Ace Attorney series to the point where he claims he knows them extremely well.

Starting with the second game, the localization direction was handled by Janet Hsu; one of the first decisions they had to make was how to localize Maya's hometown and the Fey clan. They decided to localize it around the idea that Ace Attorney takes place in an alternative-universe United States where anti-Japanese laws like the California Alien Land Law of 1913 were not passed, anti-Japanese sentiments were not powerful, and Japanese culture flourished. Because of this, the Fey clan and things related to it, such as the Kurain channeling technique, were kept Japanese as it was seen as part of Maya's heritage. Despite this, Maya's favorite food, ramen, was changed to hamburgers in the English version; Maya is said to enjoy both foods in Spirit of Justice. Producer Motohide Eshiro said there was too many requests to add Maya back to the series after finishing the fifth installment and thus added her back.

=== Design ===
Maya was redesigned as an adult in Spirit of Justice.

Along with the rest of the first game's characters, Maya was designed and drawn by Kumiko Suekane and Tatsuro Iwamoto. She was given liveness style in order to support Phoenix. However, later revisions led to make Maya more attractive visually. Iwamoto believes she was not skilled at drawing adults and thus believed that she was more skilled with Maya by the time of the character was created.

Maya was originally designed with clothes typical for traditional Japanese spirit mediums, including a kimono and a magatama bead; the kimono design was altered compared to the source material, however, with the hem drastically shortened. For situations when she channels Mia's spirit, her design changes: her hair and clothing remains, while her face and body change, looking like Mia's, with the intent of emphasizing the difference in their bust sizes. She is given yet another alternative design for part of the third game, Trials and Tribulations, where she wears a waitress uniform, replacing all of her regular clothes and accessories save for the beads in her hair. Because Takumi wanted the first three Ace Attorney games feel like three installments in one larger work, he wanted to avoid a situation where the first game looks outdated compared to the third: because of this, Maya and other major characters such as Miles Edgeworth and Phoenix retain the same character graphics throughout all their appearances in the first three games.

For Maya's reappearance in Spirit of Justice, she was given a renewed design; before settling on the final version, the development team considered using her mother, Misty Fey, as a motif and base for the redesign. Since the game is given the number 6 in Japan, Capcom decided to incorporate it as a symbolism to Maya's character. Fuse designed her in parallel with the Khura'in Kingdom place. There was a struggle with how to properly draw an adult Maya when compared to her younger self from the first trilogy and meet players' expectations. As a result, Fuse illustrated Maya from the first game era himself, and then tand started revisiting each part of the design to decide little by little which fits more and avoid drastic changes. Her facial expression were also revisited, bringing parallels to her sister Mia, but in the end the artist decide to keep her own original face. When it came it to her looks, the team decided to keep the same aura but revisiting the clothes in order to make her look like her mother. Both Eshiro and fans were delighted by Fuse's new take on the character; Eshiro came to see this Maya from a parent-like point of view considering how she grew up. There was also an option to make her a full-fledged adult, but the staff was against that. On a second thought, they found it necessary to fit the body of a 28 year old woman.

== Appearances ==
Maya first appears in Phoenix Wright: Ace Attorney, where she is introduced as defense attorney Mia Fey's younger sister and a member of the Fey clan, a family of spirit mediums living in the isolated mountain town of Kurain Village. Following the death of her sister, she is framed and accused of sororicide, only to be defended and proven innocent by Mia's mentee, junior attorney Phoenix Wright. In gratitude, Maya becomes his legal assistant and partner, helping him investigate crime scenes and using her medium abilities to channel her sister's spirit when they need guidance. At the conclusion of the game, she decides to return to Kurain Village to focus on her medium training.

In Phoenix Wright: Ace Attorney – Justice for All, Phoenix and Maya reunite in Kurain Village, where Phoenix defends her from false murder charges orchestrated by her aunt Morgan Fey, and she once again becomes his assistant while watching over her younger cousin and Morgan's daughter, Pearl Fey. Later, she is kidnapped by an assassin and held ransom to force Phoenix into defending a guilty client. With his friends' help, Phoenix is able to solve the case and rescue Maya. Maya returns in Phoenix Wright: Ace Attorney – Trials and Tribulations, again acting as Phoenix's assistant during several cases. During a trip with Phoenix and Pearl to a mountain retreat, she is nearly killed as part of another plot by Morgan, only to be saved by Godot and her mother, Misty Fey, who had disappeared many years prior. Though she is briefly accused of Misty's murder, Phoenix discovers the true guilty party and proves her innocence.

Maya does not make a physical appearance in the series' fourth and fifth entries. However, she is mentioned in dialogue by other characters in Apollo Justice: Ace Attorney. Later, in Phoenix Wright: Ace Attorney – Dual Destinies, she sends a letter to Phoenix encouraging him, which cheers him up during a difficult case. Maya returns in Phoenix Wright: Ace Attorney – Spirit of Justice, reuniting with Phoenix in the kingdom of Khura'in after spending two years training there to become a full-fledged spirit medium and the new head of the Fey clan. Once again being accused of murder, she is defended by Phoenix and assists him in his efforts to change Khura'in's legal system. In the game's DLC case, she joins with Phoenix as his partner and assistant once again for the duration of the case.

Outside of the main Ace Attorney series, Maya makes brief cameo appearances in the Ace Attorney Investigations spin-off titles, and once again appears as Phoenix's assistant in the crossover title Professor Layton vs. Phoenix Wright: Ace Attorney. Maya also appears in several other Capcom titles, including as part of Phoenix's attacks in Ultimate Marvel vs. Capcom 3, as a solo unit with Phoenix in Project X Zone 2, and as a collectible card in Onimusha Soul. Maya has appeared in other media adaptations of Ace Attorney. She is a recurring character in the Ace Attorney manga series published by Kodansha Comics, in a series of stage musicals performed by the Takarazuka Revue, and in a series of stage plays performed by the Super Eccentric Theater. Maya also appears in the Ace Attorney film, which loosely adapts her role from the first game, and the Ace Attorney anime series, which adapts the events of the original trilogy.

Maya is portrayed by three different actors in Japanese-language media: Mirei Kiritani in the Ace Attorney film and Professor Layton vs. Phoenix Wright: Ace Attorney; Satomi Hanamura in Project X Zone 2 and Spirit of Justice; and Aoi Yūki in the anime series. In the English release of Spirit of Justice, she is voiced by Abby Trott, while she is voiced by Lindsay Seidel in the anime series. Kiritani was surprised when she was offered the role as Maya in the film, as she had been playing the games herself for a long time. Yūki was anxious during the audition for the role, and said that she had her own idea of Maya's character at first, but learned to understand the character through directions from Ayumu Watanabe, the anime's director.

== Critical reception ==
Maya was received well by critics, especially for her comic relief throughout the series. IGN listed Maya among the best video game sidekick characters for her helpfulness and quick-thinking in a list of the "best video game wingmen ever", commenting that Wright "owes a lot of his success to Maya Fey." Hardcore Gamer praised the banter between her and Phoenix as among the best in video games. The website called them "the perfect leads" in the Ace Attorney manga due to their "goofiness" and how they are portrayed as close friends. In the book What Is a Game?, Phoenix's decision to defend Maya once again in Spirit of Justice is noted to occur regardless of the player's decisions to better understand the character.

Maya was also well received in the anime adaptation. Anime News Network called Maya their favorite character in the anime, and said that her character benefited greatly from being animated, with her playfulness well presented through her wide range of actions and expressions. However, Kotaku wrote that her portrayal and casting in the Ace Attorney film did not fare as well, where she appeared "emotionally unstable" rather than retaining her childlike innocence from the video games. Reviewers regretted Maya's omission from the fourth and fifth Ace Attorney games, and both reviewers and fans praised her return and design in the sixth game as feeling like "catching up with an old pal" and a reminder of what fans appreciate about the series. Anime News Network felt that Maya was not that strong in the adaptation due to Phoenix's skills contrast to the video games where the player is relying on her advices. Game Informer claimed that Spirit of Justice has the best storyline in the franchise due to the depth given by the two player characters, with the original dynamic between Phoenix and Maya being surpassed by the new lead.

Toshi Nakamura at Kotaku considered Maya a staple of the series since its start, and said that it was shocking that she did not appear in Dual Destinies. Similarly, John Walker of Eurogamer questioned the series' move to a new cast with Apollo Justice, saying that Maya's character arc had not yet been completed in Trials and Tribulations. USgamer's Nadia Oxford described Maya's reappearance in Spirit of Justice as "catching up with an old pal", and as a reminder of why players "fell in love with" the series to begin with. Her reintroduction along with her new design as an adult was positively received by series fans, with a lot of excited discussion about her on social media. Bob Mackey, also writing for USgamer, discussed Spirit of Justice's use of elements from previous games, and called Maya's return the most notable of them. Steven Bogos of The Escapist called her a fan favorite, and said that her return was a treat for players. Alexa Ray Corriea at GameSpot also liked her reappearance, and said that after playing one of the episodes set in the United States, she was "itching to get back to Khura'in" and spend time with Maya.

In "Objection!: Ace Attorney and the Japanese Criminal Courts", Emmalee A. Ellison from Marshall University noted that despite the series relying on fantasies, both Maya and her sister originate from Village of Kurain and the Kingdom of Khura’in and their designs bears many characteristics of Japanese culture, such as the Shinto religious symbols of magatamas. Maya's character also serves as another element of fantasy accompanies the player and Phoenix in the narrative though later installments reveal make the fantasy elements more common like with the introduction of Apollo Justice. Due to the need of a localization to Western regions, Ellison further elaborated how Takumi used tricks in order to keep Maya's traits intact, thus allowing Kurain Village to exist in the translated version. In The Girl at the Center of the World: Gender, Genre, and Remediation in Bishōjo Media Works, Forrest Greenwood from University of Minnesota Press claims that Maya is in charge of providing comic relief in the narrative helping to balance the state of the premise. Chuapp praised the friendly characterization of Maya, but noted that she began appearing infrequently as the series progressed.
