= Phoenix Wright: Ace Attorney =

2001 video game

- North American Nintendo DS box art featuring (clockwise from upper left) the judge, Miles Edgeworth, Phoenix Wright, and Maya Fey
- Developer: Capcom Production Studio 4
- Publisher: Capcom
- Director: Shu Takumi
- Producers: Atsushi Inaba; Minae Matsukawa (DS)
- Programmer: Noriyuki Otani
- Artists: Kumiko Suekane; Tatsuro Iwamoto
- Writer: Shu Takumi
- Composers: Masakazu Sugimori; Naoto Tanaka (DS)
- Series: Ace Attorney
- Platforms: Game Boy Advance, Nintendo DS, Windows, Wii, iOS
- Release: Game Boy Advance: JP: October 12, 2001; Nintendo DS: JP: September 15, 2005; NA: October 11, 2005; EU: March 16, 2006; Windows: JP: December 23, 2005; Wii; Episodes 1-4: JP: December 15, 2009; NA: January 11, 2010; PAL: January 15, 2010; Episode 5: JP: March 16, 2010; NA: May 24, 2010; PAL: May 2010; iOS: JP: December 21, 2009; NA: May 24, 2010
- Genres: Visual novel, adventure
- Mode: Single-player

Phoenix Wright: Ace Attorney (Note: Known in Japan as Gyakuten Saiban (Japanese: 逆転裁判; lit. Turnabout Trial)) is a visual novel adventure game developed and published by Capcom. It was released in 2001 for the Game Boy Advance in Japan and has been ported to multiple platforms. The 2005 Nintendo DS version, titled Gyakuten Saiban Yomigaeru Gyakuten in Japan, introduced an English language option, and was the first time the game was released in North America and Europe. It is the first entry in the Ace Attorney series; several sequels and spin-offs were produced, while this game has seen further ports and remasters for computers, game consoles, and mobile devices.

The story follows Phoenix Wright, a rookie defense attorney who attempts to have his clients declared "not guilty". Among other characters are Phoenix's boss, Mia Fey; his assistant and Mia's sister, Maya; and prosecutor Miles Edgeworth. The player controls Phoenix through two sets of sections: investigations and courtroom trials. During investigations they gather information and evidence. During trials they cross-examine witnesses, and answer questions from the judge, the prosecutor, and the witnesses. The story is split into five cases. The fifth was introduced in the Nintendo DS version to take advantage of gameplay elements using the handheld's touchscreen not available in the original Game Boy Advance version.

A team of seven developed the game over the course of ten months. Written and directed by Shu Takumi, it was originally planned as a Game Boy Color game about a private investigator. The game was designed to be simple; Takumi wanted it easy enough that even his mother could play. While the original version of the game takes place in Japan, the localization is set in the United States; this became an issue when localizing later games, where the Japanese setting was more obvious.

Generally, the game has been positively received by critics who praised its premise, writing, characters, and presentation. The game has been a commercial success both in Japan and internationally. The release sales in North America broke expectations, and as a result the software became difficult to find in stores shortly after its release. Other media based on the game have been produced. It has been credited with helping to popularize visual novels in the Western world, and has been cited as one of the greatest games ever made. A manga series premiered in 2006, a film adaptation of the game, titled Ace Attorney, premiered in 2012, and an anime series adaptation aired in 2016.

A high-definition version of the first three Ace Attorney games, Phoenix Wright: Ace Attorney Trilogy HD, (Note: Known in Japan as Gyakuten Saiban 123HD: Naruhodō Ryūichi (逆転裁判 123HD 〜成歩堂 龍一編〜; "Turnabout Trial 123HD: Ryūichi Naruhodō")) was released for iOS and Android in Japan on February 7, 2012, and for iOS in the West on May 30, 2013. Another collection of the first three games, Phoenix Wright: Ace Attorney Trilogy, (Note: Known in Japan as Gyakuten Saiban 123: Naruhodō Ryūichi Selection (逆転裁判123 成歩堂セレクション; "Turnabout Trial 123: Ryūichi Naruhodō Selection")) was released for the Nintendo 3DS in Japan on April 17, 2014, in North America on December 9, 2014, and in Europe on December 11, 2014. It was also released for Nintendo Switch, PlayStation 4, and Xbox One on February 21, 2019, in Japan, and on April 9, 2019, internationally; a Windows version was released internationally on the same date.

== Gameplay ==
A cross-examination in the DS version of the game, showing the witness on the top screen. The player can move between statements, press the witness for details, or present evidence that contradicts the testimony.

Phoenix Wright: Ace Attorney is a visual novel adventure game where the player takes the role of Phoenix Wright, a rookie defense attorney, and attempts to defend their clients in five cases. These cases are played in a specific order. After finishing them, the player can re-play them in any order. Each case begins with an opening cinematic cutscene often depicting a murder; shortly thereafter, the player is given the job of defending the prime suspect in the case. The gameplay is divided into two sections, investigations and courtroom trials.

During investigations, which usually take place before or between trial sessions, the player gathers information and evidence by talking to characters such as their client, witnesses, and the police. The player can move a cursor to examine various things in the environment. By using a menu the player can move to different locations, examine evidence, and present evidence to other characters. By showing certain pieces of evidence to some witnesses, the player can access new information.

A fifth case titled "Rise from the Ashes" was created for the Nintendo DS version (and included in all subsequent releases), which is a post-credits bonus episode that is unlocked when the main game is completed. In "Rise from the Ashes" the player is able to examine evidence more closely, rotating it to view it from all sides, and zooming in or out on it using touchscreen controls; they are also able to move a cursor to investigate specific parts of the evidence. The fifth case is significantly longer than the other episodes, and it also features forensics tests the player can use at crime scenes to find clues. The player can spray luminol by tapping areas they want to examine on the touch screen allowing them to see otherwise invisible blood stains. They can touch the touch screen to apply aluminum flake powder to search for finger prints. After applying it, they can blow into the microphone to reveal the prints. Once the player has gathered enough evidence, the investigation section ends.

During the courtroom trials, the player aims to prove their clients' innocence; to do so, they cross-examine witnesses. During these cross-examinations, the player aims to uncover lies and inconsistencies in the witnesses' testimony. They are able to go back and forth between the different statements in the testimony and can press the witness for more details about a statement. When the player finds an inconsistency, they can present a piece of evidence that contradicts the statement. In the Nintendo DS version, the player can choose to press and present by using vocal commands. In the Wii version, players have the option to present evidence by swinging the Wii Remote. At certain points, the player has to answer questions from the judge, the witnesses, or the prosecutor through a multiple-choice answer selection, or by presenting evidence that supports Wright's claims. A number of exclamation marks are shown on the screen; if the player presents an incorrect piece of evidence, one of them disappears. If they all disappear, the client is found guilty and the player must restart. When the player solves a case, they unlock a new one to play.

== Plot ==
In 2016, (Note: The murder of Gregory Edgeworth takes place in 2001, with the game taking place 15 years later.) Phoenix Wright, a newly hired defense attorney at Fey & Co. Law Offices, agrees to represent his childhood friend Larry Butz who has been charged with the murder of his girlfriend Cindy Stone. With the help of his boss and mentor, Mia Fey, Phoenix proves that Frank Sahwit, the prosecution's eyewitness, is the real murderer.

Mia is killed in her office shortly thereafter, and her younger sister Maya, a spirit medium in training, is arrested on suspicion of Mia's murder after Detective Dick Gumshoe finds her name written on a note in Mia's blood. Phoenix takes her case, facing off against Miles Edgeworth, a skilled prosecutor Phoenix knows from childhood and who has yet to lose a case in his career. Phoenix manages to identify Redd White, a professional blackmailer, as the real killer, but finds himself charged with the murder after White pulls strings at the Prosecutor's Office. Representing himself, Phoenix works with Maya, who uses her spirit medium powers to channel Mia's spirit and Mia subsequently gets White to admit his guilt. In gratitude, Maya becomes Phoenix's assistant as he takes over Mia's law firm. His reputation established, Phoenix takes on another case, this time defending Will Powers, the lead actor in the Steel Samurai children's TV show, against accusations that he killed his co-star Jack Hammer. It is revealed that Hammer was being blackmailed by Dee Vasquez, the show's producer, who killed him in self-defense after he tried to kill her and frame Powers for her murder.

On Christmas, Edgeworth is arrested on suspicion of murdering attorney Robert Hammond. Edgeworth initially refuses Phoenix's offer of help but then relents and allows Phoenix to represent him in court. Phoenix faces Edgeworth's mentor Manfred von Karma, who has not lost a single case in his forty-year career. Wright discovers that former bailiff Yanni Yogi shot Hammond with a gun provided by von Karma. Fifteen years earlier, Edgeworth's defense attorney father Gregory ruined von Karma's spotless record when he got von Karma penalized for forging evidence. Unable to deal with a blemish on his record, von Karma murdered Gregory and manipulated Edgeworth into believing that he was responsible. At the same time, Yogi was publicly blamed and convinced by Hammond, his attorney, to plead insanity, which got him acquitted of all charges at the cost of both his fiancée and social standing, leaving the truth hidden until the present day. Von Karma suffers a breakdown in court and confesses to Gregory's murder, and Edgeworth is released. Following the trial, Phoenix explains that Edgeworth motivated him to become an attorney after he defended Phoenix from a false theft accusation as a child, to which Larry admits he was the true culprit. Edgeworth, however, decided to become von Karma's pupil following his father's murder due to his hatred of criminals; he decides to rethink whether or not he should continue prosecuting. Meanwhile, Maya returns to her home village to finish her spirit medium training.

In a fifth case added for the Nintendo DS and subsequent releases, Phoenix is hired by Ema Skye to defend her older sister Lana, the head of the prosecutor's office, who is accused of murdering detective Bruce Goodman. Together with Ema, Phoenix traces the origins of the murder to an incident two years ago, when serial killer Joe Darke allegedly murdered prosecutor Neil Marshall while trying to escape custody, but Phoenix also discovers a piece of evidence that implicates Ema as Marshall's killer. Police Chief Damon Gant attempts to force Phoenix into exposing Ema's guilt, but Phoenix figures out that Gant actually murdered Marshall and tampered with the evidence to frame Ema so that he could blackmail Lana into doing his bidding for the past two years; Gant subsequently confesses that he killed Goodman after he requested that the Joe Darke case be reopened, and forced Lana to take the fall. Although Lana is cleared of the murder charge, she will face judgment as Gant's accomplice. With Ema being sent to Europe to continue training as a forensic investigator, Phoenix looks forward to continuing his career defending the innocent. It is then revealed that Edgeworth has disappeared.

There is also a bad ending where Ema is implicated as Marshall's murderer and Lana is found guilty.

== Development ==
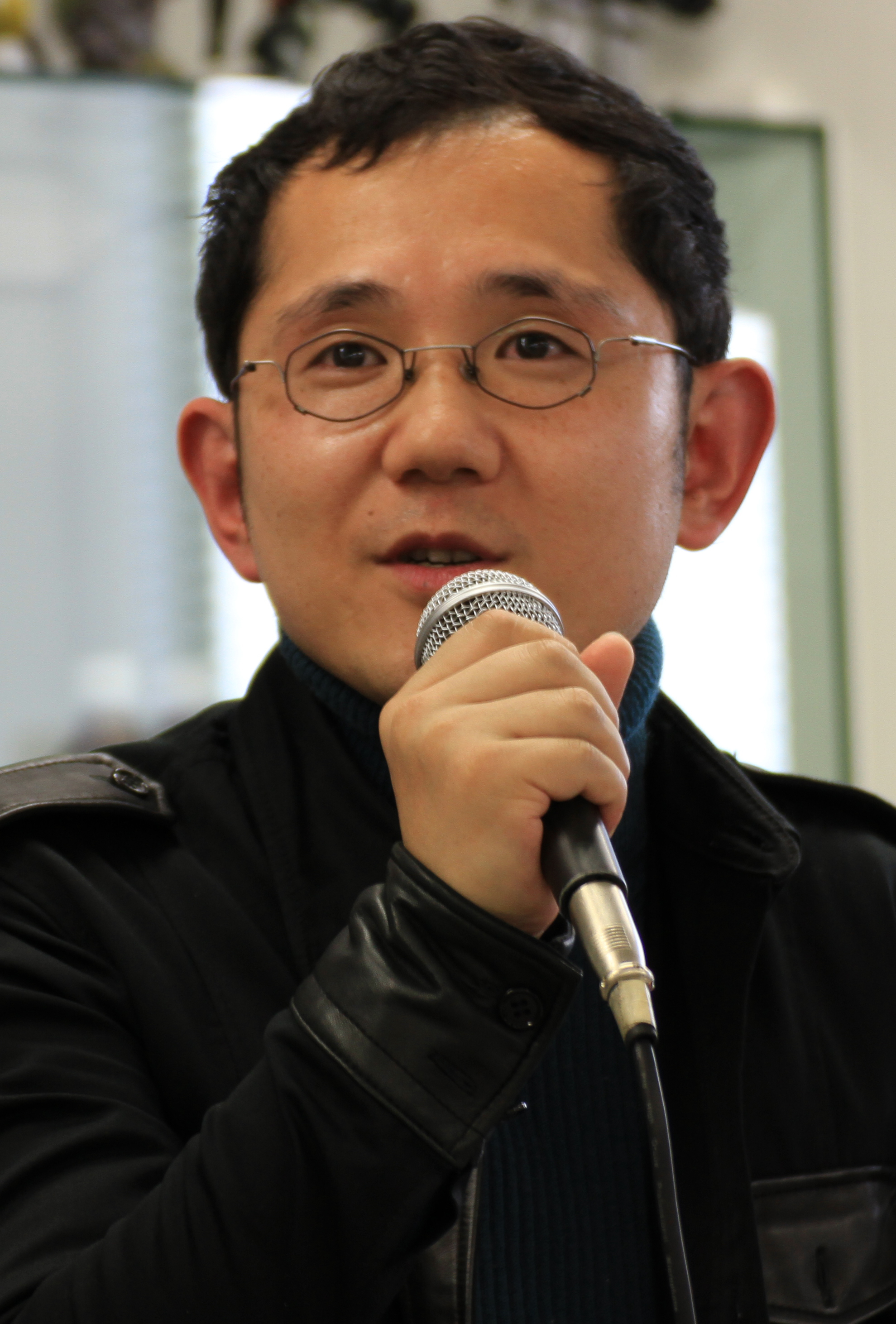
The game was written and directed by Shu Takumi.

A seven-person team developed Phoenix Wright: Ace Attorney over the course of ten months. It was directed by Shu Takumi and produced by Atsushi Inaba, with music by Masakazu Sugimori. Kumiko Suekane designed the characters, with art by Tatsuro Iwamoto. In 2000, after Takumi had finished his work on Dino Crisis 2, his boss, Shinji Mikami, gave him six months to create any type of game he wanted. Takumi had originally joined Capcom wanting to make mystery and adventure games and felt this was a big chance to make his mark as a creator. Takumi said that he initially received criticism for Ace Attorney's concept for its relation to law and a perceived requirement of legal knowledge, but he said that the main point of Ace Attorney was the "fun from solving puzzles and...calling witnesses out in their lies and evidence."

At first, the game was planned to be released for the Game Boy Color, but after the development team saw the Game Boy Advance system's screen and footage of Mega Man Battle Network, Takumi felt it would be perfect for Phoenix Wright: Ace Attorney. The game was designed to be simple, as Takumi wanted it to be easy enough for even his mother to play. As it was less common at the time to use professional voice actors, the development team provided the game's voice clips; each staff member recorded every sample needed for the game, and then the best ones were used. Takumi used his privilege as the director to cast himself as Phoenix, while Sugimori voiced von Karma and Iwamoto voiced Edgeworth.

The game was originally going to be a detective game, with Phoenix as a private investigator who finds a body at his client's office and is arrested. As the lawyer who is assigned to his case is useless, Phoenix takes up his own defense. One staff member suggested that Phoenix should be a hamster; while this didn't happen, this early version of Phoenix did have a pet hamster. It was decided early during development to refer to the game as Surviban: Attorney Detective Naruhodo-kun, with "surviban" being a portmanteau of "survival" and the Japanese word "saiban" (裁判; "court" or "trial"). Among other names considered were Boogie-Woogie Innocence and Bingo Bengo, with "bingo" referring to answering correctly and "bengo" (弁護) being Japanese for legal representation. Takumi soon realized that finding and taking apart contradictions was not related to detective work. He felt the main setting of the game should be courtrooms. At one point the game was in danger of being cancelled when two staff members left the company, but Takumi's division leader and Inaba enlisted a member of the Resident Evil development team to help them part-time.

Takumi cited Japanese mystery author Edogawa Ranpo as an inspiration, particularly The Psychological Test, a short story which involves a crime that "unravels due to the criminal's contradictory testimony." It had a big impact on him, and was a major influence on the game. He was also inspired by stories from another Japanese author, Shinichi Hoshi, stating that he was pursuing his "element of surprise and unexpectedness." The voice acting expressions "Objection!" and "Hold it!" were added to the game midway through development when Atsushi Mori joined the team as the co-sound effects designer.

=== Writing ===
Takumi felt the best way to write a mystery with a good climax is to reveal various clues, then pull them together into one conclusion, and not have multiple possible endings. He said the biggest challenge with this is making the gameplay and story work together. The goal is to make the player feel they have driven the story forward themselves, with their own choices, even though the game is linear. While writing the episodes, Takumi ranked the importance of each. The first episode was the most important, to make sure the player likes the game; the second episode was the second most important, to solidify the player's interest, and the finale was the third most important. In general, each scenario was finished before anything else was done. Then characters were designed based on the scenarios, and Takumi adjusted the dialogue as needed to make sure it fit the designs. At this point, the scenes that were to have specific cut-in illustrations made for them were decided. Takumi drew rough sketches of them and also drew the storyboards for the episodes' openings, which consisted of a series of detailed drawings showing what is happening.

In Takumi's first draft of the story, the second episode, "Turnabout Sisters", was the first episode of the game. The development team decided because of its length, among other factors, it did not work well easing players into the game. As a result, he wrote a shorter episode, "The First Turnabout", which was used as the game's first episode. He wanted players to focus on the thrill of "nailing the culprit", especially for the first episode. For this reason, the culprit in the first episode is shown in its opening. This was the most direct way Takumi could think of doing it. Takumi said it was a challenge to write the episode. In addition to keeping it short, he had to set up the world of Ace Attorney and the types of characters players would meet. The third episode was written for the sake of the character Miles Edgeworth, and the theme of the fourth episode was "rekindling the relationship". In it, Takumi tried to portray an intensively strong friendship between Phoenix and Edgeworth. He did wonder if that was what people got from it, saying that some people interpreted the bond between Phoenix and Edgeworth as "intensively passionate". Because of these two episodes, Takumi considered Edgeworth to be the game's protagonist in a way. The classroom trial in the game's fourth episode is based on real events: when Takumi was in second grade, he had found a 5 yen coin and put it in his pocket; his teacher accused him of stealing it from another student and made him apologize to her.

Takumi spent little time writing a backstory for Phoenix before writing the game's story, and instead made up dialogue and developed Phoenix's personality as he went along. He said Phoenix is himself in everything but name, with dialogue similar to what Takumi would have said in each situation in the games. He attributed this to being a first-time writer who did not think about developing characterization before writing the story. Takumi did not write a backstory for Dick Gumshoe. His character and personality just "fell into place" after Takumi decided the character would end his sentences with "pal". Other aspects of the character came about organically as he wrote the story. For instance, at one point Edgeworth says he will cut Gumshoe's salary; this became part of Gumshoe's backstory. Takumi came up with the partner character Maya thinking it would be more fun for players to have another character with them, providing advice, rather than investigating on their own. Originally, she was going to be a lawyer-in-training, preparing to take the bar exam.

Larry Butz, the game's first defendant, was particularly difficult for Takumi to write. He re-wrote the character several times. Originally, he was going to be an "average Joe" type of character, who only appeared in the game's fourth episode. After his inclusion in the first episode, however, Suekane and Iwamoto told Takumi to give the character "some oomph". Takumi then wrote him as a "prickly tough-guy" who had the habit of telling people he was going to kill them. Some of the higher-ups at Capcom did not like this, so Takumi changed him to a character who laments his lot in life, saying "I'm going to die!" or that the situation is killing him. The third episode's culprit was originally going to be male, until Suekane pointed out that all the game's villains were men. The development team debated what to do with the now female character. Some staff members thought it would be odd to have a female character be the director of an action show, and some wondered what to do with the director role if she could not fill it. In the end, Takumi changed the scriptwriter character to a director, and made the culprit a "strong, glamorous, fashionable, and cool-headed" producer. There was originally supposed to be five cases for the game. For the scrapped fifth case, Takumi had an idea that the client, Edgeworth, who Wright agreed to defend for the fourth case, would've ended up as the real murderer. However, this was scrapped due to Takumi not wanting to kill off Edgeworth in the first game. The idea of defending the real murderer of a case would be revisited in the final case of the game's sequel. Takumi stated if he went with the idea, the mystery of Misty Fey would've been solved in the game's sequel and the third entry to the series may have potentially not have existed. Takumi's favourite case in the game and series overall, is Turnabout Goodbyes.

=== Music ===
"Phoenix Wright ~ Objection! 2001"
A 32-second excerpt of "Phoenix Wright ~ Objection! 2001", the objection theme for the original Game Boy Advance version of the game. The song was composed by Masakazu Sugimori.

The game's original soundtrack was entirely composed by Masakazu Sugimori. It was his first video game soundtrack, he worked on. Sugimori used PCM to create the music. However, the music was originally meant to be composed with programmable sound generator (PSG), He had never made music using a PSG as he was used to PCM for two years with PCM not being allowed to be utilized for development. He was worried and thought there was no way from him make PSG music as good as the team behind the Mega Man GBA games but Atsushi Mori allowed Sugimori to use PCM and not worry about the amount of notes he used or what the team thinks. He allowed him to compose as much music as he could on the limited hardware. Despite, one of the game's programmers being angry at him, he credits Mori, for allowing the music and sound effects, claiming that if it weren't for him, it would've sounded completely different and the game wouldn't have been as popular.

Besides the team wanting Sugimori to use PSG, he had the freedom to make any type of music, he wanted for the game despite having initial discussions to discuss how Sugimori would approach the music of the game. However, Shu Takumi gave out instructions to him to make sure the music didn't interfere with the thinking process of the player during the deduction scenes of the game and wanted every scene to have completely different sounding music. As a result, Sugimori decided to use music that he was listening to, such as jazz fusion groups, classical musicians, Jpop, western music, 80s pop music and rock bands. Sugimori's goal wasn't to create music that could be simply categorised into a single genre, but to instead infuse the soundtrack with a bunch of different styles that would help convey the necessary emotions of each individual scene. Sugimori originally planned to use fusion music but quickly decided to make music that had the chords of fusion music, but the rhythm of techno music.

The first song composed for the game was the game's normal investigation theme, "Investigation ~ Opening 2001". Sugimori found making music for the game and development in general was difficult due to Capcom not having any Game Boy Advance hardware for development for a period of time, only having access to "bare" motherboards, The team was angry at him due to the volume being too low despite the volume being set to its highest. The objection theme, "Phoenix Wright ~ Objection 2001" was originally meant to be the main theme of the game, the song was created really quickly according to Takumi, that he himself forgot when Sugimori finished the song. Sugimori himself considers the song to be the game's main theme, he wanted the song to come across as " the strongest, 'Aren't I the coolest?' impression" despite the song's short length, he wanted it to be impactful. Originally, the track: Pressing Pursuit 2001 was supposed to appear as Objection 2001's second half of the song but Sugimori was unable to do so due to hardware restrictions, which he explained that was the reason, the song was "so short."

Maya and Mia Fey's theme song, "Maya Fey ~ Turnabout Sisters Theme 2001" was originally designed to be an upbeat song but when Mia was written to be killed in the game's second trial, the song was made to be more slightly more sombre with the addition of a half-tone chord progression in the main part of the track. The Steel Samurai theme song was the only song that was praised by the game's producer Atushi Inaba. During the making of "The Steel Samurai", Sugimori downplayed the melody or sequences in some of the game's other tracks, with some of songs being downgraded to use bass, so the melody of "The Steel Samurai" stood out amongst the game's soundtrack. Sugimori's favourite song that he composed for the game was "Investigation ~ Core".

Near the end of the game's development, Sugimori found the work on the game was significantly more challenging than he initially anticipated, with his health declining due to overwork. During the few weeks of development, Sugimori took a "long leave" from the game's development, due to departure, the team rushed to put the remaining music that were unfinished during Sugimori's exit. Some of the music that was initially scrapped had to be used in-game, which included the game's credit theme, "End" which was one of the songs left unfinished. However, Sugimori claims that the only work that was needed to be finished was debugging the finished game. Sugimori was advised by his doctor to stay at home and rest instead of going to work, he claimed he was really close to dying.

Sugimori wouldn't be involved in the composition of the Nintendo DS version due to his departure from Capcom and shift to freelance. When Takumi announced he would return as composer for Ghost Trick on May 12, 2010, Sugimori was surprised at the shock and excitement from Ace Attorney fans online. He was also shocked that the Ace Attorney series and the music he produced for the first game had become so popular to which he had no idea till he found out until he heard about the positive reception to the announcement of him making the Ghost Trick's soundtrack but was grateful for the reception.

=== Nintendo DS version ===
A bonus episode, "Rise from the Ashes", was included in the game's 2005 Nintendo DS port. Minae Matsukawa produced the fifth episode, under supervision of Inaba and Mikami. Naoto Tanaka composed new music pieces for "Rise from the Ashes". Because the episode is not included in the 2001 Japan-only GBA release, it takes advantage of various Nintendo DS features such as use of the touch screen to examine evidence, among various other technical improvements that are missing from the other episodes / original game. The idea to include the use of the Nintendo DS system's microphone came from American Capcom staff members. The Japanese staff did not like the idea of adding unnecessary features, but Takumi thought it was important to make the American audience happy, so it was included as an optional feature.

Most of the game's soundtrack sound quality was also enhanced on the Nintendo DS version, with an extra audio track that would complement most of the game's melodies.

== Release ==
The game was originally released for the Game Boy Advance on October 12, 2001, in Japan. The Nintendo DS port, which was titled Gyakuten Saiban: Yomigaeru Gyakuten (逆転裁判 蘇る逆転; "Turnabout Trial: Revived Turnabout"), was released in Japan on September 15, 2005, and included a new episode and an English language option. The hope was the English language option would be a selling point in Japan, and that Japanese people studying English would play the game. North American and European releases followed on October 11, 2005, and March 31, 2006, respectively. A PC port of the Game Boy Advance version, developed by Daletto, was released in Japan in an episodic format, beginning on March 18, 2008. Yomigaeru Gyakuten was later released on Wii via WiiWare in Japan on December 15, 2009, in North America on January 11, 2010, and in Europe on January 15, 2010. The fifth episode was released separately on WiiWare, on March 16, 2010, in Japan, in May 2010 in Europe, and on May 24, 2010, in North America. An iOS version of Yomigaeru Gyakuten was released in Japan on December 21, 2009, and in the West on May 24, 2010.

=== Localization ===
The localization of the game was outsourced to Bowne Global, and handled by writer Alexander O. Smith, who was unfamiliar with the Ace Attorney series before working on it, and editor Steve Anderson. While the Japanese version of the game takes place in Japan, the localized version is set in the United States. Normally the setting would be left vague while cultural differences the target audience would not understand would be adapted. Because one of the episodes involves time zones, however, they had to specify where the game takes place and chose California without thinking a lot about it. This became an issue in later games, where the Japanese setting was more obvious. Bowne Global staff handled all the voice roles in the localized version; Takumi had wanted to do the English voice for Phoenix, but Ben Judd handled it.

Smith faced several problems related to the game's use of puns. In the Japanese version, each character has a name that relies on Japanese wordplay. While Smith and Anderson had a lot of freedom when it came to localizing the names of minor characters, they had to discuss the names of the main cast with Capcom. Smith came up with a list of first and last names for Phoenix. The first suggestion was "Roger Wright"; "Phoenix" was also on the list, but further down. Smith felt that "Wright" had to be the character's surname, because Phoenix's surname in the Japanese version—"Naruhodō", meaning "I see" or "I understand"—was used many times in the game's text as a joke. The reason for the suggested first name "Roger" was alliteration; and "Roger" was a good source for jokes. A staff member of the development team, however, thought that "Roger Wright" was too similar to "Roger Rabbit". Other suggested first names included "Pierce", "Xavier", "Marcus", and "Zane". In the end, "Phoenix" was chosen for its heroic sound.

As the game's dialogue consists of a lot of wordplay and misunderstandings, Smith would analyze scenes before writing them: he would determine what the scenes were trying to accomplish, and where their beats were. After he had the structure of a scene in his head, he would write it. At times he was able to make use of the original Japanese dialogue, but most of the time he had to come up with new ideas himself. At several points, the English wordplay was inspired by the wordplay in the Japanese version. At others it was not possible to have wordplay in the same places as in the Japanese version, so Smith would change the structure of the scene slightly. Sometimes Smith came up with a joke or funny line and changed the scene to make the joke work. About half the jokes were rewritten based on the characters present in the scene, rather than using translations of the Japanese jokes.

== Reception ==
Reception

Aggregate score
Aggregator	Score
Metacritic	81/100 (DS); 80/100 (iOS); 67/100 (Wii)

Review scores
Publication	Score
Eurogamer	8/10 (Wii)
Famitsu	8/10, 8/10, 9/10, 7/10 (GBA)
GameSpot	8.8/10 (DS)
IGN	7.8/10 (DS); 6/10 (Wii)
Nintendo Life	8/10 (DS); 5/10 (Wii)
Nintendo World Report	9/10 (DS)

Most versions of the game have received "generally favorable reviews" according to the review aggregator Metacritic, with aggregate scores ranging from the high 70s to the low 80s out of 100; an exception is the Wii version, which holds an aggregate score of 67/100, indicating "mixed or average reviews".

Famitsu praised the idea of making a game based around trials. They felt this was innovative, and found it exhilarating and fun to uncover witnesses' lies. Michael Cole of Nintendo World Report said the game's design and interface would make it a good choice for non-gamers as well. Craig Harris of IGN felt the main issues with the game were its linearity, and how the puzzles are simple because the player can stop witness testimony at any time. Cole, too, felt the game was very linear, and that it was unclear how to proceed at certain points. He said that because of how story-driven it is, the game has low replay value; he still felt that players might want to replay it after a few years.

Thomas Bowskill of Nintendo Life said the game had changed his idea of what can make for a great game, and called it a "masterpiece". Bowskill appreciated the 2D presentation of the investigations, saying they suited the gameplay well and that it might have been difficult to find clues if 3D graphics had been used instead. Bowskill called the investigation sections "tedious" and "boring" at times, but said they were outweighed by the "feeling of accomplishment" from solving the cases.

Carrie Gouskos of GameSpot said the game revitalized the adventure game genre. Gouskos appreciated the game's presentation, calling it "unique and outstanding". She noted the music and sound effects work well with the drama. The cross-examination graphics, showing the two opposing lawyers along with the sound effect of a sword being unsheathed, she added, created an atmosphere similar to that of a fighting game. Harris also likened the style to that of a fighting game. Gouskos said the graphics, while simple, work well to show each character's mood and personality. Harris agreed the visuals were well-drawn and called the soundtrack "nicely rendered", but felt the character animation was very limited. Cole felt the graphics, while dated, have "visual flair". He appreciated the opening cinematics for the cases, which he thought were both stylish and ambiguous, and the character animations, which he called "priceless". Nadia Oxford at USgamer said that early Ace Attorney games, despite the "tinny" sound of the Game Boy Advance versions, had spawned some of the most iconic music themes in video games; she noted "The Detective That Came From the Wild West", Jake Marshall's theme, as a particularly good track.

Bowskill found the mood of the game to be hilarious, saying the game never gets stale; he attributed this to the diversity of its characters. Gouskos called the game's characters cohesive, over-the-top, and quirky. Harris called the story interesting and well written, citing the characters, situations, and dialogue. Cole was impressed by the mysteries and their resolutions, calling them "novel, unpredictable and plausible". He also appreciated the character development arcs through the game, which he felt provided pacing and made the cases cohesive. He called the English localization "top-notch", and appreciated its humor. According to Fintan Monaghan of The Escapist, the game is a critique of the Japanese legal system, which has a 99% criminal conviction rate.

Spencer McIlvaine of Nintendo Life was disappointed in the Wii version that had only a single use for the motion controller, and how the low-resolution graphics in handheld versions of the game were used. Dan Whitehead of Eurogamer also thought the motion controls were a minor addition. He was disappointed in how little effort Capcom had put into the port compared to LucasArts' remake of The Secret of Monkey Island. IGN' Craig Harris called it "incredibly lazy", wishing it had included improved art and sharper text.

=== Accolades ===
The Game Boy Advance release was one of three titles to win the Special Award at the sixth CESA Game Awards. Eurogamer ranked the game as the 18th best video game of 2005. It was also a nominee for GameSpot's 2005 Best Adventure Game award, which went to Fahrenheit. Destructoid named the game the 48th best video game of the 2000s, citing the courtroom gameplay and characters, and calling it "one of the most unique and surprising games" of the decade. They said the third game in the series had the best story, but it relied too heavily on story events in previous Ace Attorney games; meanwhile, they found Phoenix Wright: Ace Attorney to be fresh and have challenging cases, making it the best in the series. Game Informer named it the 178th best video game of all time in 2009. Adventure Gamers named it the 29th best adventure game of all time in 2011, citing its story, characters, and creative gameplay. In 2015, GamesRadar+ named it the 55th best video game of all time, citing its music, story and look, calling it "Shu Takumi's masterpiece". In 2016, Famitsu readers voted Gyakuten Saiban as the second best Game Boy Advance title, behind only Pokémon Ruby and Sapphire. In 2017, Famitsu readers voted Gyakuten Saiban the third best adventure game of all time, behind only Steins;Gate and 428: Shibuya Scramble.

== Sales ==
The Game Boy Advance version was the 163rd best selling video game of the year in Japan in 2001, with 62,169 copies sold. Another 37,143 copies of the budget-priced Game Boy Advance re-release were sold in Japan in 2003, making it the country's 277th best selling game of the year. The Nintendo DS version was the 127th best selling game of the year in Japan in 2005, with 101,902 copies sold. Between 2006 and 2011 the game sold an additional 419,954 copies dropping from the 133rd to the 650th best selling game during that period.

Demand for the North American release of the Nintendo DS version was higher than expected. The game was hard to find in stores shortly after its release; the third printing sold out in around a week. As of February 2007, 100,000 copies had been shipped in North America, which Capcom's vice-president of marketing found surprising.

== Legacy ==
After the release of the game, sequels, spin-offs, and a crossover have been made. The second and third games in the series, Justice for All and Trials and Tribulations, were released in 2002 and 2004. The fourth game, Apollo Justice: Ace Attorney, which features the new protagonist Apollo Justice, was released in 2007. The fifth game, Dual Destinies, was released in 2013, and a sixth game, Spirit of Justice, was released in 2016. Two spin-off games starring Miles Edgeworth, Ace Attorney Investigations and Investigations 2, were released in 2009 and 2011, and two featuring Phoenix's ancestor Ryunosuke Naruhodo, The Great Ace Attorney: Adventures and The Great Ace Attorney 2: Resolve, were released in 2015 and 2017. A crossover with the Professor Layton series, titled Professor Layton vs. Phoenix Wright: Ace Attorney, was released in 2012.

A manga based on the game, written by Kenji Kuroda and drawn by Kazuo Maekawa, premiered in 2006 in Bessatsu Young Magazine. Kodansha released it in North America in five volumes from June 2011 to July 2012. The third and fourth volumes both ranked No.2 on The New York Times Manga Best Seller List for one week each in 2011 and 2012, respectively. A live action film adaptation of the game, titled Ace Attorney, produced at Toei Company, and directed by Takashi Miike, premiered in Japanese theaters on February 11, 2012. An anime series adaptation based on the original trilogy premiered in April 2016.

Phoenix Wright has been credited with helping to popularise visual novels in the Western world. Vice Magazine credits Phoenix Wright with popularising the visual novel mystery format, and notes that its success anticipated the resurgence of point-and-click adventure games as well as the international success of Japanese visual novels. According to Danganronpa director Kazutaka Kodaka, Phoenix Wright's success in North America was due to how it distinguished itself from most visual novels with its gameplay mechanics, which Danganronpa later built upon and helped it also find success in North America.
