= Ace Attorney (film) =

- Theatrical release poster
- Directed by: Takashi Miike
- Written by: Takeharu Sakurai; Sachiko Ōguchi
- Based on: Phoenix Wright: Ace Attorney by Shu Takumi
- Starring: Hiroki Narimiya; Mirei Kiritani; Takumi Saitoh
- Cinematography: Masakazu Oka
- Edited by: Kenji Yamashita
- Music by: Kōji Endō
- Production companies: OLM; Nippon Television Network
- Distributed by: Toho
- Release date: 11 February 2012 (Japan)
- Running time: 134 minutes
- Country: Japan
- Language: Japanese
- Box office: ¥540 million ($6.77 million)

Ace Attorney (Japanese: 逆転裁判, Hepburn: Gyakuten Saiban; lit. "Turnabout Trial") is a 2012 Japanese epic legal comedy-drama film directed by Takashi Miike, based on the Capcom video game Phoenix Wright: Ace Attorney. Starring Hiroki Narimiya, Mirei Kiritani, and Takumi Saitoh, the film follows rookie defense attorney Phoenix Wright, who takes on a series of court cases, culminating in one that pits him against Manfred von Karma, a prosecutor who has remained undefeated throughout his forty-year career.

It made its premiere at the International Film Festival Rotterdam on 1 February 2012 and was released in Japanese cinemas on 11 February 2012. The US premiere was made at the Hawaii International Film Festival in April 2012. Miike has stated there are plans for an international release with both dubbing and subtitles available for each specific region, however such dubs have never been produced.

== Plot ==
The court system, overburdened by the massive number of crimes being committed, introduces a radical new method for settling cases more quickly: the bench trial system. Both prosecution and defense face each other in open court and have three days to make their case before the judge renders a verdict.

Phoenix Wright, a rookie defense attorney, has just won his first case by defending his friend Larry Butz from a false charge of murder with assistance from his mentor, veteran attorney Mia Fey. Butz gives Mia a statue of The Thinker as thanks. Wright is then thrust into another major case when Mia is bludgeoned to death in her office with the statue, and her younger sister Maya, a Spirit medium, is accused of it based on a dying note from Mia. Facing off against his childhood friend Miles Edgeworth, Wright manages to prove that Mia was murdered by photojournalist Redd White, and Maya is declared not guilty. After the case, Wright reveals to Maya, who gets hired as his assistant, that he decided to become an attorney after a childhood incident where he was accused of stealing money and Miles and Butz defended him.

Soon after, Wright learns that Miles has been arrested for the murder of attorney Robert Hammond. Wright convinces Miles to accept him as his defense attorney and learns that he will be facing off against Miles's mentor, Manfred von Karma, a vicious prosecutor with a perfect record. Despite von Karma's underhanded tactics, Wright is able to deduce that Hammond was actually murdered by Yanni Yogi. Yogi was involved fifteen years prior in the "DL-6" case, concerning the death of Gregory Edgeworth, Miles's father, who was shot dead in the courtroom's evidence storage. Yogi, then a court bailiff, was accused of the murder after he discovered Gregory allegedly tampering with a gun listed as evidence in a case against von Karma. Hammond coerced him into pleading not guilty by reason of insanity, and he was released. The case destroyed Yogi's life, causing his wife to commit suicide and leaving him a broken old man. He claims to have received a package with a gun urging him to take revenge on Hammond and Miles. After Yogi's confession, Miles claims that he murdered his father, sparking a new investigation into the DL-6 case.

Wright proves that Miles is innocent of his father's murder and uncovers evidence that von Karma was the one who murdered Gregory after having committed perjury. However, he cannot prove it as the gun Gregory was believed to have tampered with and was killed with has gone missing. While thinking of a plan, Wright accidentally breaks the statue of The Thinker, finding hidden notes written by Mia on the DL-6 case and a bag with the bullet that killed Gregory, revealed to be the reason why she was killed. These pieces of evidence are used to incriminate von Karma, who suffers a nervous breakdown in court and is arrested for murder and conspiracy, resulting in the judge acquitting Miles of all charges.

Wright swears to help clear Yogi's name, and he and Miles reconcile. Butz later reveals that he was the one who stole the money that Wright was accused of stealing when they were children. Maya takes a leave of absence so she can return home for further training as a medium, while Miles and Wright continue their careers as prosecutor and defense attorney, but this time as friendly rivals rather than enemies.

== Cast ==
- Hiroki Narimiya as Phoenix Wright / Ryūichi Naruhodō
  - Takeru Shibuya as young Phoenix Wright / Ryūichi Naruhodō
- Mirei Kiritani as Maya Fey / Mayoi Ayasato
  - Ritoka Nishiguchi as young Maya Fey / Mayoi Ayasato
- Takumi Saitoh as Miles Edgeworth / Reiji Mitsurugi
  - Roi Hayashi as young Miles Edgeworth / Reiji Mitsurugi
- Rei Dan as Mia Fey / Chihiro Ayasato
  - Minami Hamabe as young Mia Fey / Chihiro Ayasato
- Shunsuke Daitō as Dick Gumshoe / Keisuke Itonokogiri
- Akiyoshi Nakao as Larry Butz / Masashi Yahari
  - Ryōhei Kamamori as young Larry Butz / Masashi Yahari
- Ryo Ishibashi as Manfred von Karma / Gō Karuma
- Akira Emoto as The Judge
- Mitsuki Tanimura as Lotta Hart / Natsumi Ōsawagi
- Takehiro Hira as Gregory Edgeworth / Shin Mitsurugi
- Eisuke Sasai as Robert Hammond / Yukio Namakura
- Makoto Ayukawa as Redd White / Masaru Konaka
- Kimiko Yo as Misty Fey / Maiko Ayasato
- Fumiyo Kohinata as Yanni Yogi / Kōtarō Haine

== Soundtrack ==
The music for Ace Attorney was composed by Kōji Endō, known for scoring other films by Takashi Miike. For the soundtrack, Endō chose to use various themes by Masakazu Sugimori from the original video game and re-arranged them for an ensemble consisting of a string orchestra, an oboe, a clarinet, two French horns, a trumpet, and a choir. Additional background music was also newly composed. The soundtrack was later released on CD to tie in with the movie. The film's theme song, "2012Spark", was composed and performed by the Japanese male rock group Porno Graffitti.

Ace Attorney Movie Original Soundtrack
No.	Title	Length
1.	"Phoenix Wright: Ace Attorney – Court Begins (Cinema Ver.)"	0:44
2.	"Phoenix Wright ~ Objection! 2001 (Cinema Ver.)"	3:34
3.	"Cross-Examination ~ Allegro 2001 (Cinema Ver.)"	3:22
4.	"Negligence"	2:03
5.	"Attachment Order"	1:08
6.	"Breaking Into a Residence"	1:18
7.	"Imprisonment with Work"	1:11
8.	"Aggravated Escape"	0:55
9.	"Suspension of Execution of the Sentence"	1:19
10.	"Necessary Measure"	1:16
11.	"Evidence"	1:32
12.	"Testify Associate Judge"	1:27
13.	"Upper Instance Court"	1:10
14.	"Kidnapping"	1:23
15.	"Attempts"	0:46
16.	"Youth"	1:46
17.	"General Period for Payment"	1:14
18.	"Investigation ~ Core 2001 (Cinema Ver.)"	1:58
19.	"Maya Fey ~ Turnabout Sisters' Theme 2001 (Diva Ver.)"	1:26
20.	"Pursuit ~ Cornered (Cinema Ver.)"	5:32
21.	"Fine"	2:18
22.	"Article 30"	2:14
23.	"Neighboring Right"	2:24
24.	"Acceptance of Stolen Property"	1:39
25.	"Robbery"	0:50
26.	"Insults"	1:17
27.	"Gambling"	1:20
28.	"Arson of Inhabited Buildings"	1:40
29.	"Theft"	1:54
30.	"Obstruction to Flood Prevention"	0:46
31.	"Unjust Enrichment"	1:43
32.	"Fanfare"	1:11
33.	"BWV 245 (Bach)"	2:38
34.	"The Steel Samurai: Warrior of Neo Olde Tokyo (Cinema Ver.)"	1:22
35.	"Maya Fey ~ Turnabout Sisters' Theme 2001 (Choir Ver.)"	2:35
Total length:		60:55

== Release ==
The film made its world premiere at the International Film Festival Rotterdam on 27 January 2012 with a release in Japanese cinemas on 11 February 2012. The film made its US premiere at the Hawaii International Film Festival in April 2012. The film was released on DVD and Blu-ray on 22 August 2012 in Japan, and on 17 April 2013 in Australia. In Germany, the film was released by Koch Media on DVD and Blu-ray on 14 June 2013.

== Reception ==
The movie earned over $1,547,000 in its opening weekend at the Japanese box office, where it grossed ¥540 million ($6.77 million) during its theatrical run.

The film received generally favorable reviews from critics. Richard Eisenbeis of Kotaku praised the film, calling it "the best video game movie ever", which was also echoed by fellow Kotaku writer Matt Hawkins. Paul Verhoeven of IGN scored it eight out of ten, calling it a great "pitch-perfect adaptation of the game." Ard Vijn of Screen Anarchy said he "loved it and so did most of the audience" at the International Film Festival Rotterdam. Megan Lehmann of The Hollywood Reporter called it a "cartoonishly fun legal drama". Travis Hopson of AXS described it as "the perfect example of an adaptation done right, capturing the frenetic and confusing storylines while remaining fresh and engaging enough for newcomers" and achieving "a certain level of greatness." Nintendo Life called it "the best video game movie out there." Matthew Razak of Destructoid described it as a good movie "that not only grabs the gamer's side of things but becomes a thing in and of itself, something rarely done by gaming movies." Brandon Harris of Indie Wire called it a stylish, "bizarre, oddly satisfying video game adaptation and otherworldly legal satire."

Jay Weissberg of Variety referred to the film as a "dull production" that was "criminally long and generally lacking in [Miike's] playful visual hyperbole." Wilma Jandoc of the Honolulu Star-Advertiser lamented that the film could not easily translate the sillier aspects of the game into the movie, but contended that a viewer not privy to the video game series could be entertained if they focused on the mystery/crime side of the movie and ignored the sillier parts.

== See also ==
- List of films based on video games
