= Hiroki Narimiya =

Japanese actor

- 成宮 寛貴
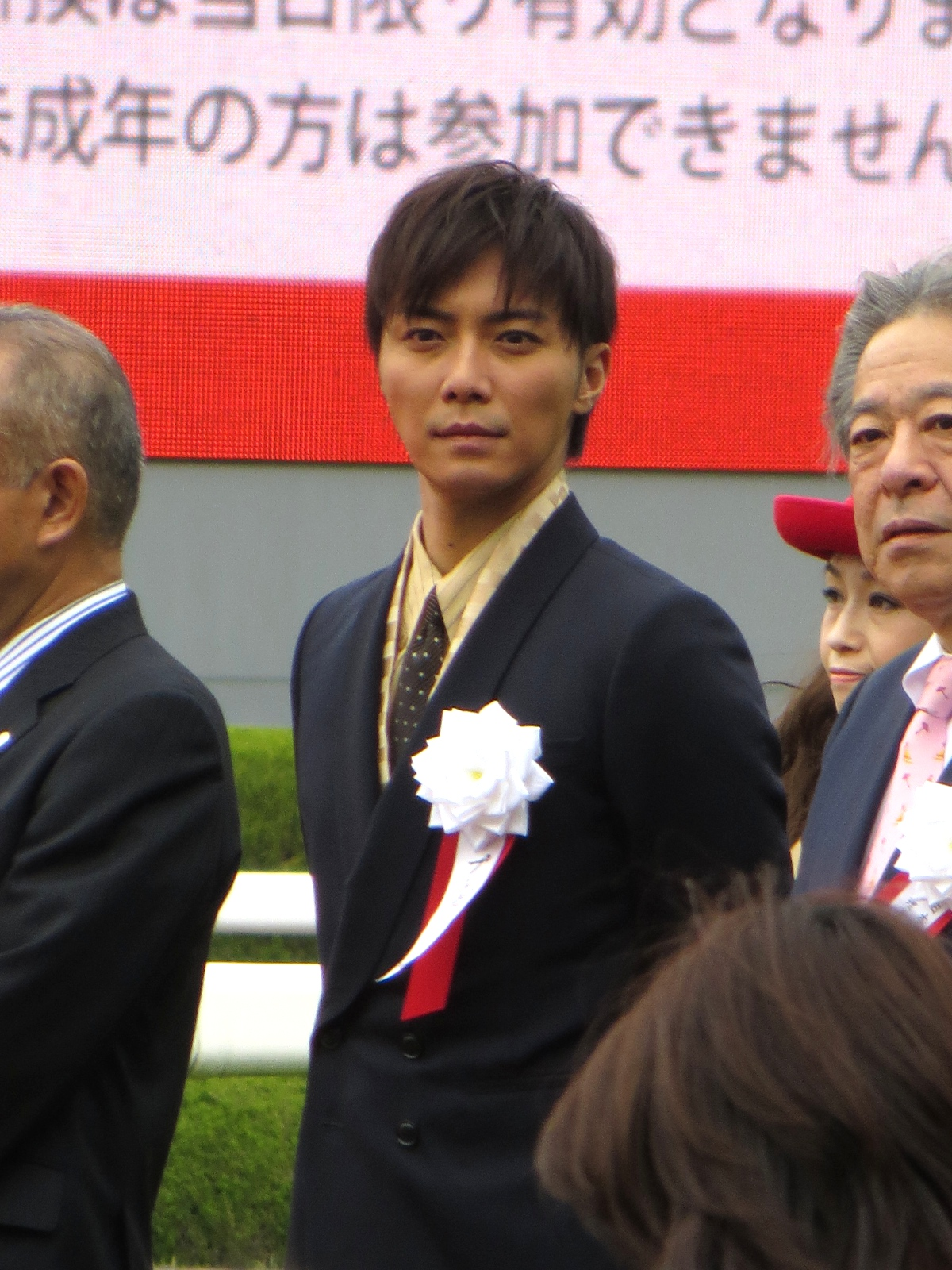
- Narimiya in 2015
- Born: 平宮 博重; September 14, 1982 (age 43); Tokyo, Japan
- Occupation: Actor
- Years active: 2000–2016, 2024–present
- Website: www.narimiya.net

Hiroshige Narimiya (平宮 博重, Narimiya Hiroshige) (born September 14, 1982), better known as Hiroki Narimiya (成宮 寛貴, Narimiya Hiroki), is a Japanese actor.

== Early life ==
He was born and raised in Tokyo, Japan. His parents are from Okinawa Prefecture. His parents divorced when he was young, and in his third year of junior high school, his mother died and he raised his brother by dropping out of school, taking on part-time jobs, and paid for his brother's high school and college expenses. He had made a promise to his mother to become serious about acting and through his multitude of part-time jobs, was eventually scouted and passed an audition making his way into his debut in 2000.

== Career ==
He soon debuted in 2000 in the play "Horobikaketa Jinrui, Sono Ai no Honshitsu to wa (Perishing Humankind, What is the Essence of Its Love?)." Hiroki was chosen for the part of Kane out of the 3000 actors who auditioned.

In February 2001, he made his movie debut in "Oboreru Sakana", a Toei production. In 2002, he appeared as Noda in the television drama, "Gokusen." With his life-sized performance in this role, Hiroki won both serious acclaim and popularity. That same year, he was the lead in "Okan wa Uchu wo Shihaisuru", a television special on Fuji Television Network. Come 2003, he performed in his first period film, Azumi, which became a box office hit and allowed Hiroki to display his swordplay skills from daily training.

In 2004, Hiroki returned to the stage in the Shakespearean play "Oki ni Mesumama (As You Like It)" and had a supporting role in the TBS drama Orange Days. The next year, he starred in the TBS series "Ima, Ai ni Yukimasu" and was featured in four films, including Nana, the sequel for which was released December 2006. In 2012, Hiroki starred as Phoenix Wright in the live-action film adaption Ace Attorney directed by Takashi Miike.

While working on his acting career, Hiroki has been proving himself quite the fashion leader. He designed a line of clothes along with many collaboration projects. Fall 2003, he appeared as a model for his Tokyo collection. His trademark hairstyle (the "Narimiya Cut") became all the rage among Japanese teens. Hiroki has also appeared on more than 10 covers of fashion and other magazines in the past year and received the 2005 Crystallized Style Award (presented by Swarovski).

Hiroki has received many offers to model overseas for high-fashion brands, which fits in his plans to pursue work outside Japan as both a model and actor.

On December 9, 2016, Narimiya sent a fax to TV news channels announcing that he was leaving the entertainment industry due to allegations he used cocaine.

Right after Narimiya's retirement announcement, the masked wrestler The Great Sasuke, a member of Michinoku Pro Wrestling, wrote on his blog: "Does this mean that 10 years ago, my foolish son will have to admit that the harassment he suffered from you was true?" When asked to clarify the "harassment" mentioned during a press conference, on December 14, Sasuke confirmed, "It was sexual harassment. I'm saying it straight—sexual harassment. This is something I can clearly state." When asked if he was referring specifically to Narimiya, Sasuke responded, "Yes." Regarding the relationship between Narimiya and his son, Sasuke explained, "They met in a professional setting. I was told that the incident happened right after they first met."

Sasuke went on to reveal that his son had been diagnosed with post-traumatic stress disorder (PTSD) as a result of the incident and is currently receiving treatment overseas. "In the past few years, he's been reclusive, cutting himself off from external information," Sasuke said. When asked how his son was reacting to the ongoing situation, Sasuke replied, "He's completely unresponsive. He probably doesn't know about it. He's not in a condition to talk." Sasuke made it clear that he had no intention of suing Narimiya, adding, "Since I've already publicly spoken out, I would like to have a discussion with the managers of Narimiya's agency. I want them to understand my true intentions."

== Filmography ==
=== Movies ===
Year	Title	Role	Notes	Source
2005	Nana	Nobuo Terashima		
2006	Nana 2	Nobuo Terashima		
2010	The Lone Scalpel	Nakamura's adult son		
2012	Ace Attorney	Phoenix Wright / Ryūichi Naruhodō	Lead role	
2026	Beasts Clutching at Straws	Ryosuke Ebato		

=== Dramas ===
Year	Title	Role	Notes	Source
2006	Koumyou ga Tsuji	Toyotomi Hidetsugu	Taiga drama	
2007	The Family			
2008–10	Bloody Monday	J	2 seasons	
2013–15	AIBOU: Tokyo Detective Duo	Toru Kai	Seasons 11–13	
2016	Kaitō Yamaneko	Hideo Katsumura		
2025	Shinu Hodo Aishite	Masato		

=== Video games ===
Year	Title	Role	Notes	Console	Source
2010	Yakuza 4	Masayoshi Tanimura	Voice and likeness. Replaced by Toshiki Masuda in the remastered version.	PlayStation 3	
2012	Professor Layton vs. Phoenix Wright: Ace Attorney	Phoenix Wright		Nintendo 3DS	

=== Dubbing roles ===
Title	Role	Voice dub for	Notes	Source
Supernatural	Sam Winchester	Jared Padalecki	Season 1-2 only	
