= Professor Layton vs. Phoenix Wright: Ace Attorney =

2012 video game

- European cover art featuring (from left to right) Luke Triton, Hershel Layton, Phoenix Wright, and Maya Fey
- Developers: Capcom; Level-5
- Publishers: JP: Level-5; WW: Nintendo
- Directors: Shu Takumi; Atsushi Kanno
- Producers: Hironobu Takeshita; Takayuki Hama
- Artist: Kazuya Nuri
- Writers: Shu Takumi; Akihiro Hino
- Composers: Tomohito Nishiura; Yasumasa Kitagawa
- Series: Ace Attorney; Professor Layton
- Platform: Nintendo 3DS
- Release: JP: November 29, 2012; EU: March 28, 2014; AU: March 29, 2014; NA: August 29, 2014
- Genres: Adventure, puzzle, visual novel
- Mode: Single-player

Professor Layton vs. Phoenix Wright: Ace Attorney (Note: Known in Japan as Reiton-kyōju vs Gyakuten Saiban (レイトン教授VS逆転裁判; lit. Professor Layton vs. Turnabout Trial)) is a visual novel adventure puzzle video game for the Nintendo 3DS, and was developed by both Capcom and Level-5, the latter publishing it in Japan while Nintendo published it worldwide. The game is a crossover between two game series from both developers, combining the puzzle and exploration elements of Level-5's Professor Layton series, and the general trial mechanics of Capcom's Ace Attorney adventure series, the latter enhanced by the addition of a few new elements, including multiple witnesses, a concept continued with into the prequel series The Great Ace Attorney. Shu Takumi, the series director for the Ace Attorney series, assisted with the scenario designs for the game. The plot focuses on Professor Layton and Phoenix Wright, along with their respective assistants, working together to solve the mystery behind a young girl that they both encounter separately, and a strange world they are brought to through her, with Layton focused on solving puzzles and finding clues to solve the mystery, while Wright focuses on defending people who are put on trial for being "witches".

The game was initially released in Japan on November 29, 2012, before eventually being released in Europe on March 28, 2014, Australia on March 29, 2014, and North America on August 29. The game has since received generally positive reviews from critics.

== Gameplay ==
The game follows Professor Layton, Luke Triton, Phoenix Wright and Maya Fey as they attempt to solve the mystery of Labyrinthia. The game has two main styles of gameplay, Adventure and Witch Trial, which feature elements from the Professor Layton and Ace Attorney series respectively. The game features voice acting and animated cutscenes, a staple in the Professor Layton games but a first for the Ace Attorney series. This has since become a new standard for the latter series, starting with Dual Destinies, which was released in Japan after the crossover title.

During Adventure segments, players can explore various environments, conversing with characters and examining background objects in order to find clues to solving the mystery of Labyrinthia. The control scheme is similar to the one introduced in Professor Layton and the Miracle Mask, in which players navigate the environments by moving around a cursor on the screen. Investigating certain areas or conversing with certain characters reveals various puzzles, which task players with finding its solution. Solving these puzzles earn Picarats, with more earned for making fewer mistakes, which go towards unlocking bonus content. Throughout these sections, players may also find Hint Coins which can be spent to unlock hints whilst solving puzzles.

In the Witch Trial sections, players take control of Phoenix Wright as he cross-examines witnesses in order to defend his client. While cross-examining a witness, the player can press them for more details, which can sometimes yield new information or evidence. The player's main task is to look for contradictions in the witness statements and present the evidence that contradicts their statement. If the player presents the wrong evidence at the wrong time, the player will lose a strike, with the game ending if the player loses all of their strikes. This time around, Phoenix will occasionally experience a "mob trial", forcing him to cross-examine multiple witnesses at once. Whilst pressing one witness, another may react to one of their statements, and questioning them may yield new information or evidence. In addition to the Court Record, which contains evidence on the case, Phoenix also has access to the Grand Grimoire, a book of magic spells which can also be used as evidence. Hint coins found during the Adventure segments can also be used during trials, providing hints on how the player should progress. Additional Picarats are earned at the end of each trial based on how many strikes are remaining.

=== Downloadable content ===
Level-5 announced that they would release downloadable content for the game, including a new storyline written by Shu Takumi, which would be split up in 12 episodes. It is playable when the game has been cleared once. The downloadable content was released every Wednesday for 24 weeks, starting on December 12, 2012, and alternated each week between new gallery content and new story episodes with additional puzzles.

In PAL regions, the content was offered in a similar manner, starting with a story episode on the game's release date, and then releasing new content every week until the start of September. In North America, content was released regularly over the course of six weeks beginning on the game's release date.

The downloadable story episodes, which are considered non-canon and frequently break the fourth wall, take place one year after the events of the game and feature Layton, Luke, Phoenix, and Maya returning to Labyrinthia for a visit.

== Plot ==
In London, Espella Cantabella seeks the aid of Professor Layton and his apprentice Luke. The three are attacked by what appear to be witches; Espella escapes on a cargo freighter while Layton and Luke are seemingly drawn into a medieval town called Labyrinthia via a book owned by Espella. Espella is quickly arrested for assault and theft when the freighter docks, following an attack on a freighter staff member. Phoenix Wright, an American defense attorney in London as part of a legal exchange, is assigned to Espella's case. Phoenix ultimately deduces that Espella stumbled upon a jewel smuggling operation and was attacked by the supposed victim. Afterwards, he and his assistant Maya Fey are drawn into Labyrinthia through Espella's book as well.

Layton and Luke learn that Labyrinthia is controlled by the Storyteller, a man who allegedly can turn anything he writes into reality. The town's Knights of the Inquisition, led by High Inquisitor Darklaw, prosecute and execute by fire all supposed witches in the Witch's Court. The Inquisition seeks to locate the Great Witch Bezella, the witches' mythical leader who caused Labyrinthia's devastating Legendary Fire millennia ago. Layton and Luke discover Phoenix and Maya, having been brainwashed into thinking they are bakers. When Espella is accused of witchcraft, she calls on Phoenix to defend her; overcoming his brainwashing, Phoenix and the others prove Espella's innocence.

As the four continue to investigate, Layton is attacked by a witch and turned into a gold statue. Maya is accused of the attack and the murder of alchemist Newton Belduke, but Phoenix proves that Belduke committed suicide and Maya did not attack Layton. He also learns that Espella is the Storyteller's daughter. Belduke's butler is exposed as a witch; Espella confesses to being Bezella to protect her. Maya rescues Espella, only to be apparently executed in her place, while Phoenix, Luke, and Espella escape.

Layton and Maya awaken outside town, finding a settlement populated by Shades, hooded worshipers of the Great Witch. The two discover underground ruins, where they regroup with the others. The five discover the remnants of an ancient civilization that sealed a Bell of Ruin after it caused a disaster. Espella suddenly experiences visions of the Legendary Fire and flees. When the group returns to town, Bezella appears and seemingly kills the Storyteller with a colossal fire dragon. Espella is arrested and charged, with Darklaw personally prosecuting the case. Layton and Luke investigate the Storyteller's Tower, finding him alive and well at the summit. Layton realizes that the Storyteller's story is being sabotaged by outside forces. Meanwhile, Phoenix deduces that Darklaw intended to frame Espella. Layton returns and assumes the role of prosecutor so Darklaw can testify.

The Storyteller later takes the stand, revealing his real name is Arthur Cantabella. He explains that Labyrinthia is a research facility that tests the effects of a mind-controlling substance found in the groundwater, which causes anyone who drinks it to lose consciousness at the sound of silver being struck, and the townspeople are test subjects who volunteered to have their memories wiped so they could start new lives. The Legendary Fire occurred when the Bell of Ruin caused the townspeople to simultaneously fall unconscious as a result of these chemicals and the town's fires got out of control. Believing herself responsible, Espella became obsessed with the idea that she was possessed by Bezella, and Arthur created Labyrinthia's witches and mythology to counteract Espella's condition. He had the Shades create the illusions of magic and indoctrinate anyone "killed" as a result of witchcraft or the Witch Trials into their number. Belduke was Arthur's partner, but killed himself due to accumulated guilt over the deception. Darklaw is revealed to be Belduke's daughter and Espella's childhood friend Eve, who blamed Arthur for her father's suicide; she lured Layton into Labyrinthia and sabotaged the story to get revenge, and was forced to include Phoenix when he unwittingly got involved. Phoenix and Layton deduce that Eve was the one who rang the bell, but was traumatised and repressed the memory. Eve reconciles with the Cantabellas, and Arthur lifts the hypnosis. The townspeople decide to stay in Labyrinthia, and Phoenix, Layton, Maya, and Luke return to the English mainland.

== Development ==
The game was first hinted at as a crossover between Capcom and Level-5 by Keiji Inafune, who was talking to Japanese business magazine Diamond prior to the Tokyo Game Show 2010, where he mentioned that he had great respect for Akihiro Hino, CEO of Level-5. On September 25, 2010, the game was outed on Twitter when Jiro Ishii of Level-5 accidentally tweeted to Jin Fujisawa of Square Enix, "Huh? Oh, Gyakuten XX. I'm making it, with Mr. Takumi!" in Japanese. This led to rampant speculation of a new Ace Attorney game being developed by Level-5, similar to how newer Capcom games from established franchises were being developed externally, such as DmC: Devil May Cry being developed by British developer Ninja Theory. The mistake was quickly covered up by Jiro Ishii who tweeted later that day that, "A misunderstanding seems to be spreading, so let me say that I'm currently working only on Time Travelers."

The game was officially announced at the Level-5 Vision 2010 press conference on October 19, 2010. The game was originally an idea of Hino's, and a project that he himself proposed to Capcom, sometime after some initial development work had been completed. Jun Suzuki, art director for the Layton series, noted that Hino was a huge fan of the Ace Attorney series and even had challenged Suzuki to "produce something on par with Ace Attorney" while developing the Layton games. The idea came as a surprise to Shu Takumi, series creator for the Ace Attorney series. Keiji Inafune, head of Capcom's R&D Management Group, was "80 per cent certain" that Takumi would refuse the idea. However, according to Inafune, Hino was able to convince Takumi to accept the idea, giving him creative control as the main scenario writer for the project, although Takumi was not in charge of the script.

Inafune described the game as a true collaboration between the two companies jointly sharing in the effort, as opposed to the licensing of characters by one company; he felt that they "wanted to create a great history, which would have been impossible if both parties were not fully involved". Hino recognized that fans of both series would "want to see a showdown" between the lead characters as well as sections where the two "join hands and take on a really big challenge". Even though Professor Layton vs. Phoenix Wright: Ace Attorney is a crossover, Hino and Takumi both see the game as more of a legitimate installment to their respective series rather than as a spin-off. Both Level-5 and Capcom contributed towards the game's development, with Capcom specifically handling the visual design, while Level-5 took charge of publishing duties. The artwork style used is a mix between the pseudo-detailed visuals from the Ace Attorney series and the more deformed appearances of the Layton games; the mixed style was the result of a drawn-out trial-and-error process to figure out how best to mix the two conflicting styles. The game supported the 3D effects on the Nintendo 3DS console; though Level-5's developers had already worked with this feature in developing Professor Layton and the Miracle Mask in 2011, this was the first Ace Attorney game to support the feature. Takumi was initially hesitant to adopt this feature, but later came to appreciate it, recognising that the 3D visuals allowed developers to "present the action from different angles and really [expand] the freedom of expression" within the courtroom segments of the game.

The game features animated cutscenes produced by Bones. Yo Oizumi and Maki Horikita, who voiced Professor Layton and Luke in previous games, reprised their roles, whilst Phoenix and Maya were voiced by Hiroki Narimiya and Mirei Kiritani, who also played their roles in the Gyakuten Saiban live action film.

=== Localization ===
The game had originally only been announced for release in Japan, with Capcom gauging interest from the community over whether or not to localize it for other territories. In July 2011, Level-5 International America Inc. conducted a Facebook poll in which fans were asked what currently Japan-only Level-5 game they had the most interest in. Professor Layton Vs. Ace Attorney ultimately won the most votes, with over 6,000. Although the game had yet to be officially announced for release outside Japan, an English-language press release from Capcom at Tokyo Game Show 2011 hinted as such. Journalists had also noted the game's listing on various Western online retailers, further suggesting a release outside Japan. Level-5's CEO Akihiro Hino had earlier stated that Professor Layton vs. Ace Attorney would be released in North America and Europe by its international studio in 2013, however a later statement from Level 5 following its Japanese release asserted that a Western release had not been confirmed or announced.

During Japan Expo 2013 in France, when asked about a localization of the game, Level-5 CEO Akihiro Hino said that "something was in the works", but that he couldn't talk about it at the time. Level-5 International America posted about it on their Facebook page later the same day. A release for North America and Europe was finally confirmed on Nintendo's Nintendo Direct presentation on August 7, 2013, slated for release in 2014. Due to the fact the North American release fully retains the European localisation as is, this is the first Professor Layton game in the region that features Maria Darling's voice as Luke Triton, instead of Lani Minella as in previous games.

=== Music ===
The soundtrack to the game was a collaborative effort between Professor Layton series' composer Tomohito Nishiura and newcomer Yasumasa Kitagawa of Capcom. Aside from producing new compositions, both additionally arranged music from previous instalments of the respective franchises, with Kitagawa arranging some compositions from Phoenix Wright: Ace Attorney composer Masakazu Sugimori. Nishiura and Kitagawa arranged and orchestrated the music with the help of Yumiko Hashizume and Norihito Sumitomo; whom had both previously worked on the Professor Layton series. While the arranged pieces were used mostly with gameplay, the animated cutscenes were accompanied by more cinematic orchestral music. All orchestral pieces were performed by Layton Grand Caravan Orchestra.

Awarding it a score of nine out of ten, Oliver Jia of Game-OST.com praised the album as "the soundtrack that fans of both series have been wanting for years." Luna Lee of RPGFan Music similarly responded favorably to the soundtrack, but criticized the tracks for being, "segregated into two camps and [having] few overlaps with one another."

Japanese pre-orders of the game included a special bonus soundtrack containing five musical tracks and a celluloid film strip containing select animation cels. The entire soundtrack was officially released on a 3-disc set as Layton Kyouju VS Gyakuten Saiban Mahou Ongaku Taizen (lit. Professor Layton vs. Gyakuten Saiban Magical Mystery Music) on April 10, 2013. The first disc contains all Professor Layton related tracks, the second disc contains all Ace Attorney related tracks, and the third disc contains the music used during the cinematic cutscenes throughout the game.

== Reception ==
Reception

Aggregate scores
Aggregator	Score
Metacritic	79/100
OpenCritic	76% recommend

Review scores
Publication	Score
Computer and Video Games	8/10
Destructoid	8.5/10
Edge	7/10
Eurogamer	8/10
Famitsu	35/40
Game Informer	8/10
GameSpot	8/10
GamesRadar+	4/5
IGN	7.8/10
Nintendo Life	8/10
Nintendo World Report	8.5/10
Official Nintendo Magazine	90%
Pocket Gamer	8/10
Metro	9/10
Digital Spy	4/5

Professor Layton vs. Phoenix Wright: Ace Attorney received "favorable" reviews according to video game review aggregator Metacritic. Chris Kohler of Wired, in playing the Japanese version, felt the game was a missed opportunity for the crossover; while he thought the gameplay mechanics and the tweaks worked well with complementary styles, he noted that only the two main cast members from each series were brought into the game, and that the game relied on new and what he considered uninteresting characters to flesh out the story.

=== Accolades ===
Year	Award	Category	Result	Ref
2014	Golden Joystick Awards	Handheld Game of the Year	Nominated	
2015	National Academy of Video Game Trade Reviewers Awards	Art Direction, Period Influence	Nominated	
2015	National Academy of Video Game Trade Reviewers Awards	Performance in a Comedy, Lead (Christopher Robin Miller)	Nominated	
2015	National Academy of Video Game Trade Reviewers Awards	Performance in a Comedy, Lead (Trevor White)	Nominated	
2015	National Academy of Video Game Trade Reviewers Awards	Writing in a Comedy	Nominated	
