= Phoenix Wright: Ace Attorney – Justice for All =

2002 video game

- North American Nintendo DS box art featuring (from left to right) Miles Edgeworth, Franziska von Karma, Phoenix Wright, and Pearl Fey
- Developer: Capcom Production Studio 4
- Publisher: Capcom
- Director: Shu Takumi
- Producer: Atsushi Inaba
- Programmer: Tadaaki Yamamoto
- Artist: Tatsuro Iwamoto
- Writer: Shu Takumi
- Composer: Naoto Tanaka
- Series: Ace Attorney
- Platforms: Game Boy Advance, Windows, Nintendo DS, Wii
- Release: Game Boy Advance: JP: October 18, 2002; Windows: JP: March 31, 2006; Nintendo DS: JP: October 26, 2006; NA: January 16, 2007; EU: March 16, 2007; AU: September 6, 2007; Wii: JP: January 26, 2010; NA: February 15, 2010; PAL: February 19, 2010
- Genres: Adventure, visual novel
- Mode: Single-player

Phoenix Wright: Ace Attorney – Justice for All (Note: Known in Japan as Gyakuten Saiban 2 (Japanese: 逆転裁判2; lit. Turnabout Trial 2)) is a visual novel adventure video game developed and published by Capcom. It was originally released for the Game Boy Advance in 2002 in Japan, and has since been released on multiple platforms. The Nintendo DS version, initially released in 2006 in Japan, was released in English in the West in 2007. The game is the second entry in the Ace Attorney series, following Phoenix Wright: Ace Attorney.

The story follows Phoenix Wright, a defense attorney who defends his clients in four episodes. Among other characters are his investigative partner and spirit medium Maya Fey, her cousin Pearl, and the rival prosecutor Franziska von Karma. The game is divided into two types of sections: courtroom sessions, where the player cross-examines witnesses and tries to uncover contradictions in their testimonies; and investigations, where the player gathers evidence and talks to witnesses.

The game was directed and written by Shu Takumi, as the second entry in a planned Ace Attorney trilogy. It was originally intended to feature the first game's prosecutor, Miles Edgeworth, in all episodes; Franziska was created when the development team learned that Edgeworth had become popular among players, and Takumi wanted to use the character more carefully and sparingly. They only introduced one new gameplay mechanic in the game; Takumi wanted to keep the game focused on the core concept of finding lies, and to keep it simple enough for his mother to play. The game was positively received by critics, who generally liked the writing, but criticized the lack of the Nintendo DS-exclusive gameplay mechanics that appeared in the previous game.

A high-definition version of the first three Ace Attorney games, Phoenix Wright: Ace Attorney Trilogy HD, (Note: Known in Japan as Gyakuten Saiban 123HD: Naruhodō Ryūichi (逆転裁判 123HD 〜成歩堂 龍一編〜; "Turnabout Trial 123HD: Ryūichi Naruhodō")) was released for iOS and Android in Japan on February 7, 2012, and for iOS in the West on May 30, 2013. Another collection of the first three games, Phoenix Wright: Ace Attorney Trilogy, (Note: Known in Japan as Gyakuten Saiban 123: Naruhodō Ryūichi Selection (逆転裁判123 成歩堂セレクション; "Turnabout Trial 123: Ryūichi Naruhodō Selection")) was released for the Nintendo 3DS in Japan on April 17, 2014, in North America on December 9, 2014, and in Europe on December 11, 2014. It was also released for Nintendo Switch, PlayStation 4, and Xbox One on February 21, 2019, in Japan, and on April 9, 2019, internationally; a Windows version was released internationally on the same date. The PC version of the collection was among the best-selling new releases of the month on Steam. (Note: Based on total revenue for the first two weeks on sale.)

== Gameplay ==
Justice for All introduces psyche-locks, representing witnesses' secrets. The player breaks the locks by presenting evidence to get access to new information.

Justice for All is a visual novel adventure game in which the player takes the role of Phoenix Wright, a defense attorney who defends people accused of murder in four different episodes. At first, only one episode is available; as the player solves a case, a new episode is unlocked to play. The episodes are all divided into chapters, consisting of courtroom sections and investigation sections.

During the investigation sections, the player investigates the case to gather evidence needed for the trial; once enough evidence has been collected, the game moves on to the next chapter of the episode. During these sections, the player has access to a menu with four options: examine, move, present, and talk. By choosing "examine", the player can move a cursor around the screen and look at various things in the environment; by choosing "move", the player reaches a sub-menu with all locations they can choose to move to; by choosing "present", the player can choose to show a piece of evidence or a character profile to a character at the location; and by choosing "talk", the player is able to pick a topic to discuss with a character who is present at the location. As the player talks to a character, the topics they have already discussed get marked with a checkmark.

If the player chooses a topic the witnesses does not want to discuss, the player is shown locks and chains on top of the character, referred to as "psyche-locks"; additionally, a lock symbol is added to that topic in the talk menu. By presenting a magatama to the character, the player is able to start breaking the psyche-locks and unlock the topics; this is done by showing the character evidence or character profiles that proves they are hiding something. The deeper the secret is that the character is hiding, the more psyche-locks appear; by breaking all the locks, the topic gets unlocked and the player is given access to new information.

During the courtroom sections, the player attempts to get the defendant the correct verdict by questioning witnesses and presenting evidence to the judge and the prosecutor. Many witnesses lie or make errors during their testimonies; the player is able to move back and forth through the testimony to try to find any inconsistencies. There are two options available during cross-examinations: "press", which makes the player question a particular statement, which sometimes makes the witnesses change their testimony; and "present", which is used to show a piece of evidence or a character profile that the player thinks shows a contradiction in the witness's currently shown statement. In the upper right corner of the screen, the player's health bar is shown, representing the judge's patience. The bar decreases if the player makes mistakes, such as presenting the wrong piece of evidence; if it reaches zero, the defendant is declared guilty, and the player loses the game. While the player cannot lose the game while trying to break a psyche-lock, the bar will still decrease if the player presents the wrong evidence while trying to break psyche-locks. 50% of the bar is restored when the player manages to break all psyche-locks on a topic, and 100% is restored when an episode is completed.

== Plot ==
A year after the events of the previous game, Dr. Turner Grey, a private surgeon who lost his reputation due to malpractice that resulted in the death of several patients, requests Phoenix Wright's help in contacting Maya Fey, Phoenix's former assistant who had gone home to Kurain Village to finish her spirit medium training. While performing a spirit channeling on Grey's behalf, Maya apparently kills him under the influence of the channeled spirit. While defending her in court, Phoenix faces prosecutor Franziska von Karma, the daughter of his old enemy Manfred von Karma and the foster sister of his old friend Miles Edgeworth, who is presumed to have committed suicide. Teaming up with Maya and her young cousin Pearl, Phoenix uncovers a conspiracy between Mimi Miney, a disgruntled nurse who was the true culprit of the malpractice incident and had been posing as her deceased sister Ini, and Pearl's mother Morgan Fey, who holds a deep hatred of Maya's mother Misty Fey. The two plotted to kill Grey and frame Maya, ruining her chances of succeeding her mother as the leader of Kurain Village, and replace her with Pearl. Miney confesses to both her real identity and the murder, Morgan is sentenced to solitary confinement for her crimes, and Phoenix decides to take Pearl in as one of his assistants.

After Maya's trial, Phoenix is hired by policewoman Maggey Byrde, who is accused of murdering her boyfriend, policeman Dustin Prince. However, he is attacked with a fire extinguisher before the trial and suffers amnesia as a result. Gradually regaining his memory during the trial, Phoenix exposes Richard Wellington, a con artist testifying for the prosecution, as both the murderer and Phoenix's attacker. Later, circus magician Maximillion Galactica is accused of murdering his employer Russell Berry following a salary dispute. Despite Franziska's interference, Phoenix proves that Acro, one of Max's fellow performers, framed him after mistakenly killing Berry, having intended to kill Berry's daughter in revenge for an incident that left his brother comatose.

During an awards ceremony after the new year, Maya is kidnapped by assassin Shelly de Killer, who threatens to kill her if Phoenix does not win an acquittal for actor Matt Engarde, who has been arrested under suspicion of killing his rival, Juan Corrida. As a "present", de Killer shoots Franziska, rendering her unable to act as prosecutor. At the last second, Edgeworth arrives and steps in to replace her. While in court, Phoenix points to evidence that proves that Engarde's manager, Adrian Andrews, planted evidence to frame Engarde, suggesting that she is Corrida's murderer; Andrews exercises her right to remain silent. However, Phoenix is horrified when he later discovers that Engarde is the one who hired de Killer to assassinate Juan to prevent him and Andrews from revealing a scandal at the awards ceremony that would have destroyed Engarde's reputation. Phoenix subsequently has an internal dilemma over whether to convict Engarde at the cost of Maya's life, or acquit him, which would save Maya but have Andrews take the fall for Corrida's murder. With help from Edgeworth and evidence obtained by Franziska, Phoenix reveals to de Killer that Engarde betrayed his trust and planned to blackmail him with hidden camera footage of the murder. Furious, de Killer cancels his contract with Engarde and declares him his next target; fearing for his life, Engarde pleads guilty. As thanks for Phoenix revealing Engarde's betrayal, de Killer releases Maya, who reunites with Phoenix and Pearl.

Edgeworth explains that his absence was spent soul-searching for "the answer" as to what it means to be a prosecutor; he and Phoenix reconcile, while Franziska leaves. Edgeworth confronts her at the airport, where Franziska breaks down and admits her jealousy of Edgeworth and desire to prove herself superior to him, but now feels that she cannot with such huge losses on her record. Recognizing that she needs to find the same answers he did, she returns to Germany. There is also a bad ending where Engarde is found not guilty, and Andrews is subsequently convicted; as a result, Phoenix gives up practicing law and, despite being certain that de Killer released Maya, he never sees her again.

== Development ==
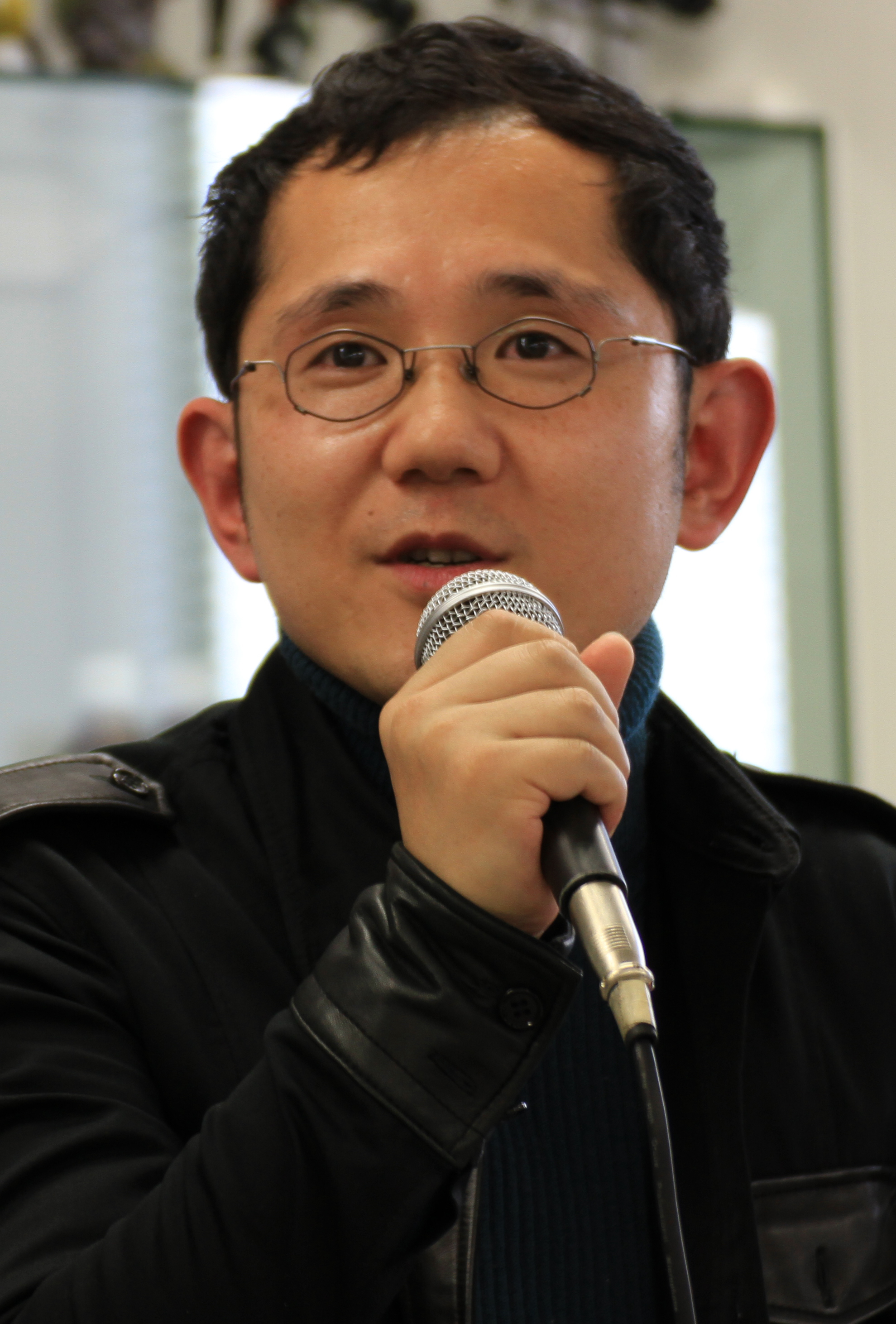
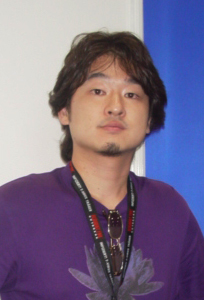
The game was directed and written by Shu Takumi (left) and produced by Atsushi Inaba (right).

After development of the original Phoenix Wright: Ace Attorney was finished, the writer and director Shu Takumi's boss, Shinji Mikami, told him that they should make an Ace Attorney trilogy, with a grand finale in the third game's last case. Development of the game began immediately when Takumi returned to work from his vacation: the producer, Atsushi Inaba, called him in to a meeting, and told Takumi that he wanted him to write the script for five episodes before the game went into full production, with a deadline of three and a half months. Takumi thought that this was "completely insane", as it had taken him an average of more than a month to write each of the four episodes for the first Ace Attorney; additionally, he felt that he did not have any "tricks" left to use for mysteries or any story threads to work off of. He wanted to protest, but still ended up having to do it. As soon as he returned to his desk, he drafted a work schedule: he scheduled two and a half month to write the dialogue, with half a month per episode, leaving him with a month to create the first prototype and figure out the "tricks" to be used in the mysteries. He doubted that he would be able to do it in time, but managed to write the whole script by the deadline. However, due to issues with memory on the game's cartridge, one episode ended up having to be cut from the game; it was later used as the third episode of the third game.

After finishing writing the dialogue, Takumi was called into another meeting with Inaba, and was told to add a new gameplay mechanic to the investigations. Takumi wanted to keep the gameplay simple enough for his mother to be able to play it, and keep it focused on the core concept of finding lies; according to him, he immediately had a vision of the psyche lock system during the meeting with Inaba, but still asked for three days to come up with an idea. He found it easy to formulate the idea, but it took over a month to create the system; the biggest problem was how to visually represent the psyche locks. Takumi also drew storyboards for the episodes' openings, which consisted of series of detailed drawings that show what is happening. He also drew rough sketches of cut-in illustrations; it was only decided after all the text had been written what scenes would have illustrations made for them. While the game's opening features the judge, it was originally supposed to have featured a demon instead; this was because Takumi was playing Devil May Cry at the time, and had liked its opening. Takumi wanted the first three Ace Attorney games to comprise three parts of a greater whole. Therefore, he avoided having a lot of changes between games: he did not want the first game to look outdated in comparison to later ones, so it was decided to keep the same graphics for main characters such as Phoenix, Maya and Edgeworth throughout all their appearances, and not make updates to them. The game's music was composed by Naoto Tanaka under the pseudonym Akemi Kimura.

As the dialogue-integrated "tutorial" in the first Ace Attorney was well received, the inclusion of one in Justice for All was considered a "major point". While the first game's tutorial involved Phoenix being helped through his first trial by his mentor Mia and the judge, this could not be used twice, which led to the idea of giving Phoenix a temporary amnesia from a blow to the head. Takumi included a circus and magic in the game's third episode; he really wanted to do this, as performing magic was a hobby of his. The episode includes two themes that he wanted to explore: the difficulties in forming a cohesive team with different people, and a person who against the odds tries to make something whole. The former was reflected in how the circus members come together at the end, while the latter was reflected in the character Moe. Several different versions of the fourth episode were created, partially because of them running out of memory on the game's cartridge, but also because of the popularity of the character of Miles Edgeworth: Takumi had originally planned to let Edgeworth be the prosecutor in all episodes, but when they were in full production the development team learned that the character had become popular, which led to Takumi feeling that he had to use the character more carefully and sparingly. Because of this, he created the character Franziska von Karma, to save Edgeworth for the game's last case, and avoid a situation where he – a supposed prodigy – loses every case. The character Pearl Fey was originally intended to be a rival character around the same age as Maya, only appearing in the game's second episode; one of the game's designers suggested that it would be more dramatic if she were much younger, so Takumi wrote her as an eight-year-old. As he ended up liking her, he included her in other episodes as well. The idea of defending your cilent who would've ended up being found out as the true murderer in the game's last case, originated from a scrapped fifth case of the first game where Wright would've agreed to defend Edgeworth only for him to be the case's true murderer. This was scrapped due to Takumi not wanting to kill off Edgeworth in the first game. Takumi claimed if he went with the idea, the mystery of Maya's mother: Misty Fey would've been solved for Justice of All. The scene in the game's epilogue where Franziska is seen crying wasn't in the initial scenario planning, while the team was listing the necessary emotions and actions, the character would perform in-game. Takumi thought Franziska would cry at some point and had Iwamato draw her sprite of her crying but it wasn't used till the end of the game. Takumi thought the sprite was too good not to be used and also thought Iwamato would cry if it was left unused, so he hastily wrote the epilogue to utilize the drawing.

== Release ==
The game was originally released for the Game Boy Advance on October 18, 2002, in Japan; a Nintendo DS version followed on October 26, 2006, in Japan, on January 16, 2007, in North America, and on March 16, 2007, in Europe. A PC port of the Game Boy Advance version, developed by a company called Daletto, was released in Japan in an episodic format, starting on April 15, 2008. A Wii version was released through WiiWare on January 26, 2010, in Japan, on February 15, 2010, in North America, and on February 19, 2010, in Europe.

=== Localization ===
Starting with Justice for All, the series localization direction has been handled by Janet Hsu; by the time they joined Capcom's localization team in 2005, the first Ace Attorney had already been localized, with the original localization team having decided to do a full localization, changing the setting from Japan to Los Angeles. While Hsu thought that this was the right choice to make, as it made the characters and dialogue more relatable and made for an emotional experience closer to what players of the Japanese version experience, it resulted in issues with each following game. According to the localization editor, Brandon Gay, Justice for All was one of their largest games to localize due to its focus on the story, and how it needs to convey the whole game world and its characters through just text; this made it a challenge to make the characters relatable for an American audience. Another thing the localization team had to keep in mind was to ensure that recurring characters were consistent with how they behave in the first Ace Attorney. According to JP Kellams, another staff member working on the localization, there was a lot of pressure on them to make a good localization, as the first game's localization had been well received; he also felt that there was room for creativity due to the game's style and subject, with room for humor that might not fit in other localizations. A lot of the humor in the original was based on Japanese wordplay; these jokes had to be redone entirely for the English release. Hsu felt that the game was more demanding than previous projects they had worked on, as the localizers "almost have to become [the characters]" in order to get the nuance and motivations right due to their complexity.

One of the first decisions Hsu had to make was how to localize Maya's hometown and the mysticism of the Fey clan. They came up with the idea that the localized versions of the Ace Attorney games take place in Los Angeles in an alternative universe where anti-Japanese laws like the California Alien Land Law of 1913 were not passed, anti-Japanese sentiments were not powerful, and where Japanese culture flourished. This dictated what should be localized and what should be kept Japanese; things relating to the Fey clan and the Kurain channeling technique were kept Japanese, as that was Maya's heritage, while Japanese foods that were not widely known in the West were changed. Despite the setting in the United States in the localized version, the Japanese justice system of the original remained intact in the localization, as changing it would have altered the entire game structure. As the localization team wanted to keep the humor in the Japanese names for the characters, it was decided to make the English names contain the same kinds of double meanings: character name puns were based on their personalities or backgrounds, or were visual gags. A lot of the names were determined with the original Japanese name in mind; for the game's third episode, several Japanese names were used without changes, since they were English puns to begin with. For some other characters, the names had to be altered heavily from the Japanese originals. Due to the dramatic feeling of the last episode, the characters in it were given names that sounded more like real names, while still making use of deeper meanings. Takumi personally approved all the English names; for one of the names, Takumi and the localization team had a discussion for days, as Takumi did not think the English name conveyed the same feeling as the Japanese one.

According to Gay, characters with "extreme personality quirks" were both fun and stressful to write: for the clown Moe, he found it challenging to get the balance right between his silly jokes and the seriousness of his dialogue. Among other challenging characters to write for were Acro, who led to "heated arguments" about how to get his personality and tone right; and Morgan Fey, whose "very old style" of speaking in the Japanese version was difficult to translate to English. One aspect they had to change due to cultural differences was a conversation with the lecherous character Director Hotti, where an animation of him grabbing in the air with his hands is played while he talks about Pearl. According to Hsu, the Japanese version is considered funny to Japanese people, as Hotti is set up as the "butt of the joke", and Phoenix reacts negatively to him, while it would have been considered sickening to an American audience. They were unable to change the animation, so the dialogue was rewritten to instead be directed at an adult nurse.

== Reception ==
Reception

Aggregate score
Aggregator	Score
Metacritic	76/100 (51 reviews)

Review scores
Publication	Score
Eurogamer	8/10
Famitsu	8/10, 9/10, 10/10, 8/10
Game Informer	8/10
GameSpot	7.7/10
GameSpy	3.5/5
GamesRadar+	4/5
IGN	7.8/10
Official Nintendo Magazine	72%
Famitsu Cube + Advance	9/10, 8/10, 9/10, 9/10

Justice for All holds a score of 76/100 at the review aggregator Metacritic based on 51 critics, indicating generally favorable reviews.

Writers for Famitsu praised the mix of seriousness and comedy, and liked the characters' quirkiness and the pacing of the conversations. John Walker at Eurogamer called the game "splendidly crazy as ever" and "the most joyfully daft fun imaginable". Tom East at Official Nintendo Magazine called the script fantastic. Joe Juba at Game Informer found the game entertaining, calling the writing hilarious and the problem-solving clever, with the two aspects complementing each other well. Aaron Thomas at GameSpot liked the game, praising the game's story and calling the characters its greatest strength. He thought that the pacing was better than the first Ace Attorney's, but still found the game to be a step back: he felt that the game often reuses the same kinds of twists from the first. Gerald Villoria at GameSpy called the episodes well structured and stronger than the ones in the first game, and called the dialogue sharp. Mikel Reparaz at GamesRadar said that the script, while entertaining, contains "long stretches of meaningless dialogue" and tends to leave the player knowing what happened and how to prove it before Phoenix does. He initially liked the new rival character Franziska, but thought that she only becomes increasingly obnoxious. Craig Harris at IGN said that the episodes are well written, with enthusiasm and personality, making them hard to put down.

Walker found the court sections "maddening" due to how the game sometimes requires very specific evidence to be presented, with evidence that he found reasonable being rejected, forcing him to resort to guessing; he wished that the health meter would have been replenished through correct answers, or that it had been removed from the game entirely. Bryan Vore at Game Informer found the investigation sections tedious at times, but found them to be helped by how the psyche-locks add "courtroom drama" to the investigations. Juba thought that the game's reliance on text made the investigations move slowly, but that the game becomes an "irresistible adventure" when the text is mixed with gameplay in the trials. Thomas found the psyche-locks interesting, but underwhelming as the only new feature. East said that the psyche-locks were what made the investigations fun. Reparaz liked how the psyche-lock mechanic adds "a new dimension of weirdness" to the game. Both Harris and Thomas wished that the game had been less linear, with more possible wrong paths to take or more endings. Thomas, Reparaz and East wished that the Nintendo DS-exclusive gameplay features introduced in the first game's final episode had been used in Justice for All, with Reparaz calling it disappointing but "not a huge deal". Villoria and East said that the game does not last very long; Walker did not consider it short, but found it to not last as long as the first game.

Vore said that the game is lacking in "advanced graphics and interface", but felt that it makes up for it through its charm and intrigue. Thomas called the character designs outstanding, but thought that the reused art assets for returning characters and locations from the first game made it feel like Capcom had "cut some corners". He called the music "uniformly outstanding and used masterfully", both for conveying various moods throughout the story, and for characters' personalities. Harris found the music "moody and appropriate", but wished that there had been a full voice-over as an option. He said that the game's art was nice, but not more than that. Thomas called the localization outstanding despite finding some errors, finding it impressive how smoothly Capcom was able to localize such a text-heavy game. Harris liked the game's localization, saying that the localization team's writing was what made the game design work so well. Walker called the localization incredible, and said that while there are a few spelling errors and grammatical errors in the text, it did not bother him much as the localization was included in the Japanese Nintendo DS release.
