= Shu Takumi =

Japanese video game developer, director and writer

- 巧 舟
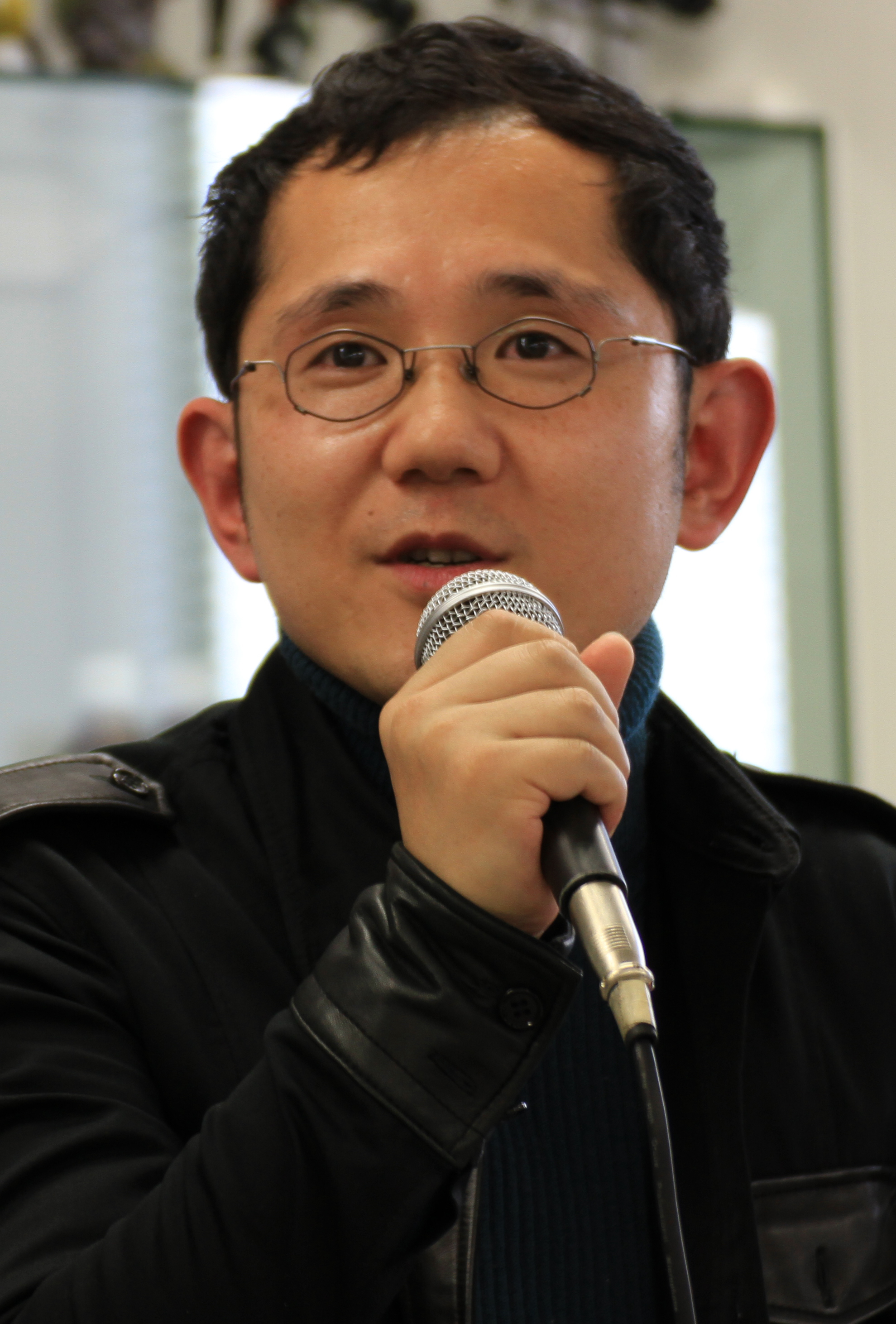
- Takumi in 2011
- Born: May 2, 1971 (age 55); Japan
- Occupations: Video game designer, director, writer
- Years active: 1994–present
- Employer: Capcom
- Known for: Dino Crisis series; Ace Attorney series; Ghost Trick

Shu Takumi (巧 舟, Takumi Shū; born 2 May 1971) is a Japanese video game designer, director, and writer at Capcom. He is best known for his work on the Ace Attorney series, serving as director and scenario writer for the original trilogy. In addition, he provided the Japanese voice of Phoenix Wright for the first four games. He then served as director and scenario writer for Ghost Trick: Phantom Detective in 2010.

== Career ==
Shu Takumi joined Capcom in 1994 along with Hideki Kamiya. His first game was Gakkou no Kowai Uwasa: Hanako-san ga Kita!! (学校のコワイうわさ 花子さんがきた!!), a 1995 video game adaptation of an anime of the same name. He was designated as a planner, and because the director was busy with multiple projects, Takumi had some freedom in his role. In the years that followed, Takumi came up with an idea for a detective game, though nothing came out of it at first.

Takumi was later picked up by Shinji Mikami to work on Dino Crisis. However, in early 1997, the Dino Crisis team was temporarily redirected to help work on the ill-fated original version of Resident Evil 2. Takumi was then made director of the Dino Crisis project before being demoted to planner, being responsible for the first half of the game. He was then made director of Dino Crisis 2, and was able to maintain his position throughout the game's development.

After the release of Dino Crisis 2, Mikami gave Takumi an opportunity to make whatever game he wanted with a small team of seven. He conceived of a detective-themed adventure game that would allow the player to input his or her deductions in some way. He thought of two ways to achieve this, one being a "joint reasoning" system in which the player would correct the deductions of a detective, and a court system in which the player, as a lawyer, would point out contradictions between witness testimony and evidence. His team began work on Phoenix Wright: Ace Attorney, a realization of the latter concept.

Phoenix Wright: Ace Attorney was originally intended for the Game Boy Color, but after being shown a demo of Mega Man Battle Network on a prototype Game Boy Advance, development moved enthusiastically to the then-upcoming handheld. Despite being such a small project with only two programmers and two graphical asset developers, with Takumi taking on the roles of planner, director and scenario writer, the team managed to finish the game in ten months. The producer, Atsushi Inaba, liked the game so much that he requested that it be made into a trilogy. Thus, Phoenix Wright: Ace Attorney – Justice for All and Phoenix Wright: Ace Attorney – Trials and Tribulations were produced in 2002 and 2004, respectively, followed by Nintendo DS ports of the three games, which were released internationally.

The 2007 game Apollo Justice: Ace Attorney was the last entry in the main series made under Takumi, who went on to create the standalone title Ghost Trick: Phantom Detective. After the release of the Nintendo 3DS, Takumi came back as scenario writer for the crossover game Professor Layton vs. Phoenix Wright: Ace Attorney. Takumi was not involved in the development of Phoenix Wright: Ace Attorney – Dual Destinies due to concentrating his efforts on said crossover game at the time. He went on to work on a spinoff series of the Ace Attorney games taking place in Victorian London and incorporating the "joint reasoning" system that he had conceived all those years before, including The Great Ace Attorney: Adventures and The Great Ace Attorney 2: Resolve, which were released in 2015 and 2017 respectively. Takumi also acted as a script supervisor for the 2016–2018 Ace Attorney anime series. After working almost exclusively on the Ace Attorney series for two decades, Takumi contributed to the 2020 mobile game Monster Hunter Riders as a questline writer.

== Ludography ==
Year	Game	Role
1995	Gakkou no Kowai Uwasa: Hanako-san ga Kita!!	Planner
1998	Resident Evil 2	Planner
1999	Dino Crisis	Lead planner, event director
2000	Dino Crisis 2	Director
2001	Phoenix Wright: Ace Attorney	Director, concept, scenario, planning (Note: Japanese voice of Phoenix Wright)
2002	Phoenix Wright: Ace Attorney – Justice for All	Director, scenario, planning
2004	Phoenix Wright: Ace Attorney – Trials and Tribulations	Director, scenario, planning
2007	Apollo Justice: Ace Attorney	Supervisor, scenario
2010	Ghost Trick: Phantom Detective	Director, scenario, game design
2011	Ultimate Marvel vs. Capcom 3	Supervisor
2012	Professor Layton vs. Phoenix Wright: Ace Attorney	Co-director, scenario
2015	The Great Ace Attorney: Adventures	Director, scenario, planning
2017	The Great Ace Attorney 2: Resolve	Director, scenario, planning
2020	Monster Hunter Riders	Quest writer
