= GK2 =

GK2 may refer to:

- Gabriel Knight 2, a 1995 video game
- Ace Attorney Investigations 2: Prosecutor's Gambit, a 2011 video game released as Gyakuten Kenji 2 in Japan
- N-acetylgalactosamine kinase, an enzyme encoded by GALK2 gene
- Glycerol kinase 2, an enzyme encoded by GK2 gene
