= Phoenix Wright: Ace Attorney Trilogy =

2014 compilation video game

- Key visual depicting the game's main characters: (clockwise from top) Miles Edgeworth, Pearl Fey, Maya Fey, Phoenix Wright, Franziska von Karma, and Godot
- Developer: Capcom (Note: Digital Works Entertainment co-developed the 2019 and 2022 multi-platform releases.)
- Publisher: Capcom
- Directors: Shinsuke Kodama; Yūki Yamagashi
- Producer: Motohide Eshiro
- Designer: Naoki Aoyagi
- Programmer: Syunta Omi
- Series: Ace Attorney
- Engine: Unity
- Platforms: Nintendo 3DS, Nintendo Switch, PlayStation 4, Xbox One, Windows, iOS, Android
- Release: April 17, 2014: Nintendo 3DS; JP: April 17, 2014; NA: December 9, 2014; EU/AU: December 11, 2014 Nintendo Switch, PlayStation 4, Xbox One, Windows; JP: February 21, 2019; WW: April 9, 2019 iOS, Android; WW: June 10, 2022
- Genres: Adventure, visual novel
- Mode: Single-player

Phoenix Wright: Ace Attorney Trilogy (Note: Known in Japan as Gyakuten Saiban 123: Naruhodō Selection (Japanese: 逆転裁判123 成歩堂セレクション, Hepburn: Gyakuten Saiban Wan Tsū Surī: Naruhodō Serekushon; lit. 'Turnabout Trial 123: Naruhodō Selection')) is a 2014 video game compilation developed and published by Capcom. It consists of the first three installments in the Ace Attorney series of visual novel adventure games: Phoenix Wright: Ace Attorney (2001), Justice for All (2002), and Trials and Tribulations (2004). It was first released for the Nintendo 3DS on April 17, 2014, and was later brought to Nintendo Switch, PlayStation 4, Xbox One, and Windows in early 2019; mobile versions were released in June 2022. The 3DS version uses high-definition graphics borrowed from an earlier mobile compilation, Phoenix Wright: Ace Attorney Trilogy HD (2012), (Note: Known in Japan as Gyakuten Saiban 123 HD (Japanese: 逆転裁判123 HD; lit. 'Turnabout Trial 123 HD')) whereas the 2019 multi-platform versions feature original upgraded assets remade by hand, in addition to various quality-of-life changes.

The compilation received generally positive reviews from game critics, who appreciated how it brought the Ace Attorney trilogy to new platforms but thought it was missing features such as a text log. Reviewers were divided on the upgraded graphics of both the 3DS and multi-platform versions; some enjoyed the change, while others thought it lacked the spirit of the original games. As of June 2026, the compilation has sold five million copies and is amongst Capcom's best-selling titles. Several other compilations have followed, including Apollo Justice: Ace Attorney Trilogy (2024) with the series' next three mainline installments.

== Gameplay and contents ==
Phoenix Wright Trilogy features remastered graphics and UI (PlayStation 4 gameplay pictured above, original Game Boy Advance version bottom). This screenshot displays one of the main characters: Maya Fey.

Phoenix Wright: Ace Attorney Trilogy is a game compilation that consists of the first three installments in the Ace Attorney franchise: Phoenix Wright: Ace Attorney (2001), Justice for All (2002), and Trials and Tribulations (2004). They are visual novel adventure games where the player controls defense attorney Phoenix Wright, who defends his clients against rival prosecutors. Gameplay is divided into two types of sections: point and click-like investigations—where the player searches for clues and persons related to the case—and trials, where they present evidence and seek out contradictions in testimonies during cross-examination.

The graphics of the three games were remastered to high-definition for Phoenix Wright: Ace Attorney Trilogy. The assets on the 2014 Nintendo 3DS version were taken from a mobile port of the games, titled Phoenix Wright: Ace Attorney Trilogy HD (2012). The graphics were redone for multi-platform re-releases of the trilogy in 2019. Audio quality was also improved for the multi-platform release, alongside the addition of more save files, language and text options (including the ability to quickly skip dialogue), remastered UI, and achievements awarded for clearing chapters and finding gags in optional dialogue. As a quality-of-life feature, a magnifying glass was added to investigation sections to serve as an indicator of what the player should inspect and what they have already searched.

Upon its initial release, Phoenix Wright Trilogy lacked features that would appear in subsequent Ace Attorney compilation games. In November 2025 – around six years after the multi-platform versions' release – the game was updated for parity with the subsequent compilations. The update added an auto-progressing "story mode", the ability to select individual story chapters, and an in-game art gallery and music player, among other quality-of-life additions.

== Development ==
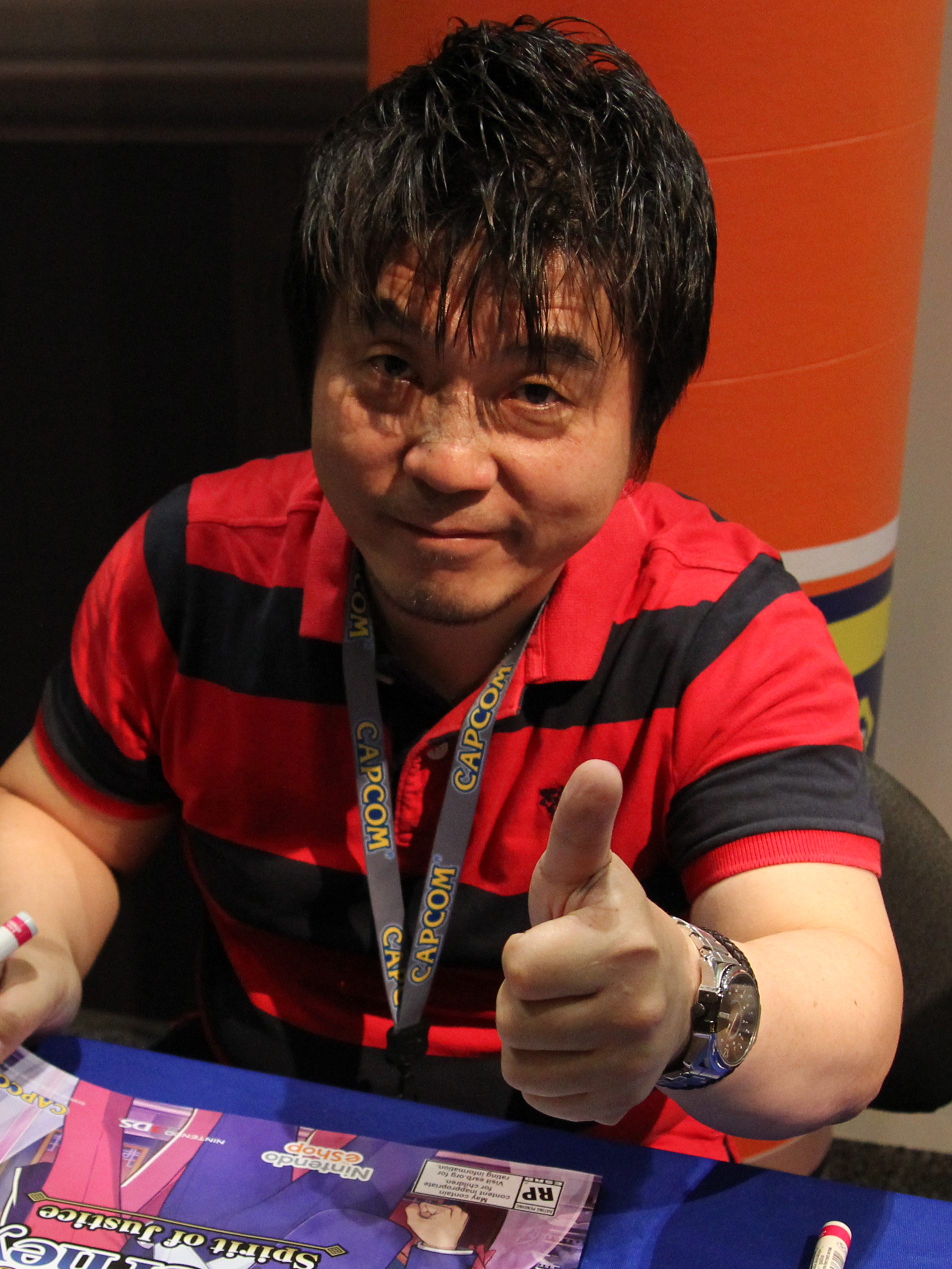
Capcom's Motohide Eshiro (pictured 2016) produced Phoenix Wright: Ace Attorney Trilogy.

Using the Unity game engine, the multi-platform versions of Phoenix Wright: Ace Attorney Trilogy were developed by Capcom in cooperation with Digital Works Entertainment. The game was directed by Yūki Yamagashi (Digital Works) and Shinsuke Kodama (Capcom); it was the latter's final work before he left the company in March 2020. Series producer Motohide Eshiro reprised his role for the trilogy compilation, while Digital Works' Naoki Aoyagi and Syunta Omi served as lead designer and programmer, respectively.

On the multi-platform versions, Eshiro hoped that the trilogy would be fun and easy-to-play for new players, such as those who learned of Ace Attorney through its anime adaptation (2016–19), and that older fans would appreciate details such as characters' eye colors and text on pieces of evidence that would be more perceptible under the refined graphics. While not all assets were remade, those that were were redrawn frame-by-frame. For text or other details that were indiscernible on the original art, the staff team referred to scenarios and the old art to deduce its meaning; when this did not work—such as in the case of the sign on a boat rental shop—they chose original text based on their own discretion. On the upgrade of characters, Eshiro said that they were particular about the look of Wright's assistant Maya Fey, who was redone many times.

=== Release and promotion ===
The Ace Attorney trilogy had been released together multiple times before Phoenix Wright: Ace Attorney Trilogy. A box set of three games' Windows versions was released in Japan in March 2006, which were published with upgraded graphics as Phoenix Wright: Ace Attorney Trilogy HD for mobile in 2012. Phoenix Wright: Ace Attorney Trilogy was first announced by Capcom for the Nintendo 3DS on January 23, 2014, and released in Japan on April 17, 2014. Among other bonuses, limited editions of the collection were bundled with a drama CD, Gyakuten no Combination, which starred Takayuki Kondo as Phoenix Wright and Eiji Takemoto as prosecutor Miles Edgeworth. It featured original characters in addition to ones from the games. Capcom also announced a three-episode online radio show with the cast of the drama. A Western release was announced on June 6, 2014, and received previews during E3 2014 a week later and at New York Comic Con in October. It was released in North America on December 9, 2014, and in Europe and Australia two days later.

In November 2017, Kotaku reported that Capcom intended to release two Ace Attorney compilations—one of the original trilogy and another of the next three games—within the 2018–19 fiscal year. While a compilation of the fourth through sixth games did not materalize at the time, Capcom announced a Switch, PlayStation 4, Xbox One, and Windows port of Phoenix Wright: Ace Attorney Trilogy during their panel at Tokyo Game Show in 2018. In Japan, Phoenix Wright: Ace Attorney Trilogy was released for Switch, PS4, and Xbox One on February 21, 2019. An international release, which also brought the game to Windows, followed on April 9. The game was distributed digital-only in the West, but received physical Switch and PlayStation versions in Japan. Japan's complete edition featured Gyakuten no Saiban Show, an audio drama written by series creator Shu Takumi. The compilation album Turnabout Tunes, which featured jazz and piano arrangements of Ace Attorney songs, was sold as downloadable content alongside the trilogy on Steam.

On March 28, 2022, Capcom announced that they would pull Phoenix Wright: Ace Attorney Trilogy HD from app stores and instead release a mobile port of the multi-platform Phoenix Wright: Ace Attorney Trilogy. Trilogy HD was delisted on June 9, and the new port was published to iOS and Android devices a day after.

The free update for PlayStation 4, Xbox One, Switch, and Windows versions of the game was announced by Capcom during Tokyo Game Show 2025, and was released on November 19, 2025.

== Reception ==
=== Reviews ===
Phoenix Wright: Ace Attorney Trilogy reviews

Aggregate scores
Aggregator	Score
Metacritic	80/100 (PS4, Xbox One, PC); 81/100 (3DS, Switch)
OpenCritic	86% recommend

Review scores
Publication	Score
GameRevolution	9/10 (PS4)
Hardcore Gamer	4.5/5 (Switch); 4/5 (3DS)
HobbyConsolas	80/100 (Switch)
IGN	7.5/10
Nintendo Life	8/10 (Switch); 9/10 (3DS)
Nintendo World Report	9/10 (Switch)
Push Square	8/10 (PS4)
USgamer	4/5 (3DS)
Windows Central	5/5 (Xbox One)

Phoenix Wright: Ace Attorney Trilogy received generally positive response from video game critics. Review aggregator Metacritic assigned a normalized score of 80 out of 100 to the game's PlayStation 4, Xbox One, and PC releases, and 81 out of 100 to its 3DS and Switch versions. (Note: Based on 24 reviews (PlayStation 4), 12 reviews (Xbox One), 10 reviews (PC), 34 reviews (3DS), and 30 reviews (Switch)) According to OpenCritic, 87% of 77 reviewers recommended the game.

For the purpose of new players, critics appreciated the availability of the Ace Attorney trilogy on newer platforms, though a few found the collection lacked incentive for long-term fans. Several critics called for the addition of a text log, which was absent. Tyler Treese for GameRevolution wrote: "Sadly, there are no sort of extras to speak of but the titles themselves are valuable enough". John Cal McCormick, writing for Push Square, appreciated how the games had finally been brought to PlayStation. IGN's Tristan Ogilive praised the games, but thought that the lack of additions gave "little incentive" for returning players to own the collection, and Álvaro Alonso for HobbyConsolas lamented the exclusion of the Spanish translation that had been present in the Nintendo DS versions.

The remastered graphics of the multi-platform versions were subject of mixed commentary. Some critics welcomed the upgrade, whereas others thought it lacked the charm of the original pixelated artstyle. Melanie Zawodniak wrote for Nintendo World Report that the remade artwork helped reanimate the series' world. Contrarily, Ogilive thought the style was "certainly very crisp" but so much so that it instead becomes uninspired. Reception to the presentation of the 3DS version was also mixed. Bob Mackey for USGamer found the enhanced graphics "hit-or-miss"; he believed the upgrades of key characters like Phoenix Wright and Miles Edgeworth worked well, but that others did not: "the Judge's beard, for example, looks like someone went crazy on it with MS Paint's Airbrush tool". Windows Central reviewer Asher Madan wrote that the 3DS release was plagued by "blurry visuals, awkward menus, and slow text", which he did not observe on the Xbox One version. Geoff Thew at Hardcore Gamer was positive to the 3DS visuals, which he considered a step-up from Trilogy HD on iOS.

The addition of rumble to console versions of the game was appreciated by Nintendo Life's Dom Reseigh-Lincoln and Hardcore Gamer's Kirstin Swalley, who thought it added to intense scenes. Thew and Thomas Whitehead, also writers for Hardcore Gamer and Nintendo Life, respectively, considered the lack of a rearranged soundtrack a slight disappointment, whereas VG247 assistant editor Alex Donaldson appreciated that the sound was left in its chiptune state. Upon playing the game's demo at E3 2014, Nintendo World Report's James Jones wrote that he was personally disappointed by the lack of a rearranged soundtrack, but considered that its addition might have alienated players who view the Game Boy Advance sound as "iconic".

=== Sales ===
According to Dengeki, Phoenix Wright Trilogy on the 3DS sold 22,907 physical copies in Japan within its first week and opened behind only Final Fantasy XIV and Yo-kai Watch as the best-selling game of the week. By May 2014, sales had climbed to 35,018. PC Gamer reported that the 2019 launch exceeded sales expectations by 150%. The Switch and PlayStation 4 versions opened on Dengeki's chart with 4,339 and 3,553 sales, respectively, which was enough to place both within the top 20. Steam listed the PC version as one of the best-selling games of April 2021. As of June 2026, the game has sold five million copies.

== Subsequent compilations ==
Phoenix Wright: Ace Attorney Trilogy has been followed by other compilations with later games in the series. The Great Ace Attorney Chronicles, a collection of the spin-off Great Ace Attorney duology set in Victorian London, was released on July 27, 2021. As initially reported by Kotaku in 2017, a collection of the fourth through sixth mainline Ace Attorney games entered development in 2021, and was released as Apollo Justice: Ace Attorney Trilogy on January 25, 2024. Ace Attorney Investigations Collection, a compilation of the Investigations duology that follows prosecutor Miles Edgeworth, was released on September 6, 2024.

Phoenix Wright Trilogy has been sold alongside its successors as bundles. It and The Great Ace Attorney Chronicles were sold on Steam as Ace Attorney Turnabout Collection from April 2019 until the set's discontinuation in April 2024. Ace Attorney Anthology, a bundle of the Phoenix Wright and Apollo Justice trilogies, was released on June 5, 2024.
