= Phoenix Wright =

Ace Attorney character

- Ace Attorney character
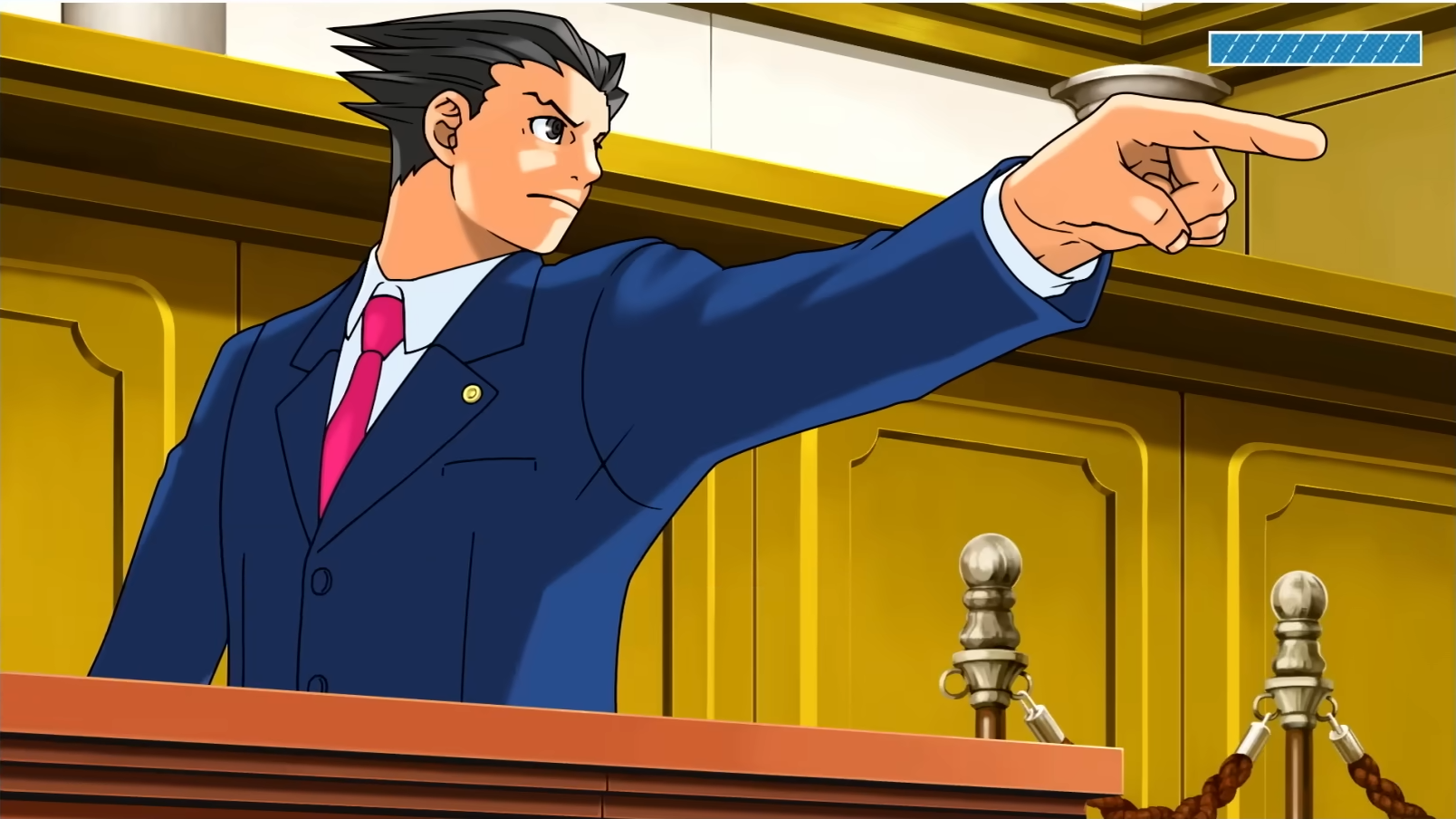
- Phoenix Wright as he appears in Phoenix Wright: Ace Attorney Trilogy
- First game: Phoenix Wright: Ace Attorney (2001)
- Created by: Shu Takumi
- Designed by: Tatsurō Iwamoto
- Portrayed by: Various: Tomu Ranju (2009 musical); Hiroki Narimiya (2012 film); Kentarou Kanesaki (2013 stage play); Yoshitaka Hara (2022 stage play)
- Voiced by: English: Ben Judd (Ace Attorney, Justice for All, Trials and Tribulations, Apollo Justice); Sam Riegel (Ultimate Marvel vs. Capcom 3, Dual Destinies, Spirit of Justice, Teppen); Trevor White (Professor Layton vs. Ace Attorney); Eric Vale (anime); Jill Harris (anime, young); Zach LeBlanc (Puzzle Fighter); Japanese: Shu Takumi (Ace Attorney, Justice for All, Trials and Tribulations, Apollo Justice); Takayuki Kondō (Dual Destinies, Project X Zone 2, Spirit of Justice); Hiroki Narimiya (Professor Layton vs. Ace Attorney); Kōsuke Toriumi (Ultimate Marvel vs. Capcom 3); Yūki Kaji (anime)

In-universe information
- Occupation: Defense attorney
- Family: Trucy Wright (adoptive daughter)
- Relatives: Ryunosuke Naruhodo (ancestor)

Phoenix "Nick" Wright, known as Ryūichi Naruhodō (Japanese: 成歩堂 龍一, Hepburn: Naruhodō Ryūichi) in the original Japanese language versions, is the fictional titular defense attorney and the protagonist in Ace Attorney, a visual novel adventure video game series created by Shu Takumi, who was an employee of Japanese gaming company Capcom. Introduced in Phoenix Wright: Ace Attorney (2001), Phoenix is a young rookie attorney who the player controls in several cases to protect the clients suspected of murder. Phoenix is the main character in the first three games, accompanied by assistants Maya and Pearl Fey and Ema Skye, mentored by the ghost of Mia Fey (channeled by the first two assistants as mediums), and rivaled by Miles Edgeworth, Franziska von Karma, and Godot. He remains in a less prominent role in the second trilogy starting with a supporting role in Apollo Justice: Ace Attorney (2007) as an older single father to Trucy Wright and mentor to Apollo Justice, before becoming a playable character again as a veteran attorney in subsequent games, mentoring Athena Cykes, rivaled by Simon Blackquill and Nahyuta Sahdmadhi, and reuniting with Maya and Pearl. The character has also appeared in film, anime, and manga adaptations of the series, a Japanese series of musicals and stage plays, as well as several crossover games.

Phoenix Wright was created by writer Shu Takumi, who wanted a character who would spot contradictions in statements. While the series was meant to end with the third game, feedback from the fans resulted in an older Phoenix becoming a supporting character in the second trilogy. While he eventually became playable, his protege Apollo Justice remained the main protagonist. Originally designed by Tatsurō Iwamoto, the character's design remained the same for the first and second trilogy except for Apollo Justice due to a request from Takumi. Across these installments and adaptations, several actors provided their talent for Phoenix with Takumi himself playing him in the original games.

Phoenix has received positive critical reception and has been described as a likeable character with a realistic profession. His mannerisms and character design have inspired many cosplayers. However, his more minor role in the second trilogy earned mixed responses for lacking his original appeal. His other appearances in the anime series and related cross-overs were still the subject of praise.

== Conception and creation ==
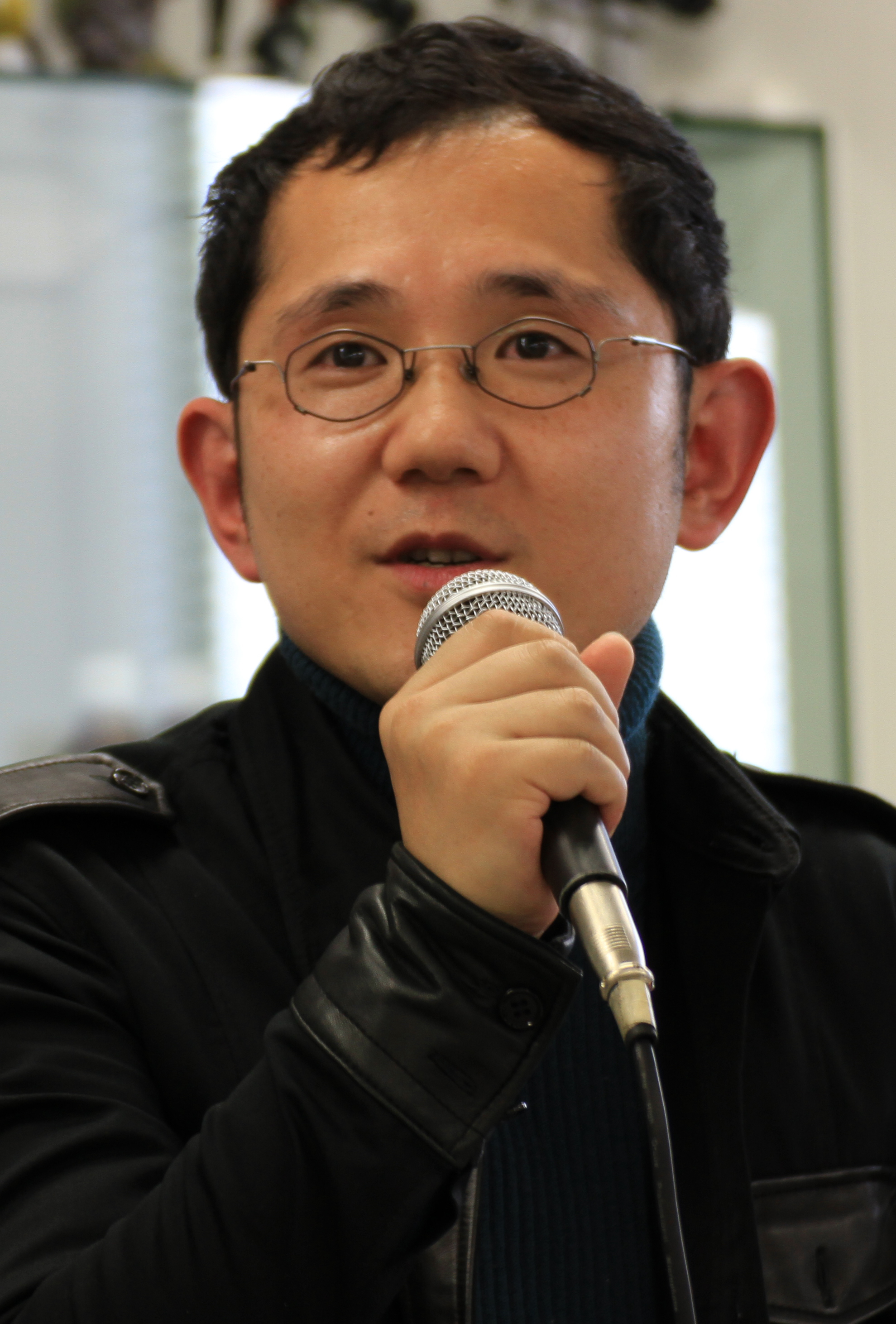
Shu Takumi created Phoenix Wright, in addition to voicing him in the Japanese language releases of the first four games in the series.

The idea of a lawyer was conceived when director Shu Takumi was searching for ideas for a game in which the player could discover lies or contradictions in statements. Takumi used his privilege as director to cast himself as Phoenix. Phoenix was a private investigator who found a body at his client's office and was arrested. As the lawyer who is assigned to his case is useless, Phoenix takes up his own defense. One staff member suggested that Phoenix should be a hamster; while this did not happen, this early version of Phoenix did have a pet hamster.

The character was designed by Tatsurō Iwamoto. In order to stand out, he was given distinctive spiky hair. Iwamoto claimed that whenever he had to design Phoenix, it had to look as his confidence shows. He draws him over and over until he can look at him and sense that he is really confident for no reason. When starting development for the first Ace Attorney, Iwamoto showed Takumi a sketch of his ideas for a suitable leading character. As Takumi's opinion of what a suitable protagonist should look like clashed with Iwamoto's, the character was redesigned again, especially as it was decided to illustrate the characters after the plot was done. Maya's design was especially praised because it fits Phoenix's character.

Takumi spent little time writing a backstory for Phoenix before writing the first game's story and instead made up dialogue and developed Phoenix's personality as he went along. Phoenix ended up being too similar to Takumi's personality. As he was too close to Takumi, one staff member revised Phoenix to be more of his own; Takumi also wanted to avoid giving the protagonist a less average personality as symbolized in Japanese by the word "ore". There was also the need to of separating Phoenix from visual novel protagonists when writing his character. Meanwhile, Miles Edgeworth was created to be Phoenix's ideal rival. Takumi came up with the partner character Maya because he thought it would be more fun for players to have another character with them giving them advice rather than investigating on their own.

Wright's Japanese given name, Ryūichi, alludes to the mythical dragon with its use of ryu (竜). His Japanese surname, Naruhodō, references the Japanese expression naruhodo (なるほど), which equates to the English "I see". This phrase is often used in Japan to express attentiveness to the subject at hand. Takumi chose the phrase to highlight Wright's inexperience; even though his name reads "I see", he may not in fact understand what is happening, something that may also be true of people using the phrase. It is also commonly used in mystery novels when investigating, which is a core gameplay concept of the series.

In English versions, Wright's name was localized to present a similar meaning to English-speaking audiences. His first name is also a mythical reference: to the phoenix, known for "rising from the ashes", an allusion to his almost impossible comebacks, or "turnabouts", during trials. This is referenced in the first game, in which the fifth case is titled "Rise from the Ashes". His surname is a pun, allowing for wordplay (such as "Right, Wright?" and "Phoenix Wrong"). Early brainstorming suggestions for Phoenix's name included "Cole" and "Wilton", but "Phoenix" was chosen as a name that would "stand out". The nickname "Nick" (used by his partner, Maya Fey, and his best friend, Larry Butz) was chosen based on its believability and similarity to the sound of "Phoenix".

As Takumi wanted the first three Ace Attorney games to be part of one larger work, he did not want the first game to look outdated in comparison to later ones, so it was decided to keep the same graphics for main characters such as Phoenix, Maya, and Edgeworth throughout all their appearances and not make updates to them. Takumi wanted the series to end with Trials and Tribulations, as he had explored Phoenix's character fully and wanted to avoid the series becoming "a shadow of its former self", saying that he thinks it is important to know when to end a story.

Because the dialogue-integrated tutorial in the first game had been well received, it was considered a major point for future games in the series. In the first game, Takumi had Phoenix being guided through his first trial by the judge and Mia, and for the second game, he had Phoenix suffer from amnesia. When writing the third game, Takumi did not know what to do, as it would not seem credible if Phoenix had amnesia a second time. Eventually he came up with the idea of using a flashback to a case where Mia had just become an attorney; he developed this idea further and ended up using flashbacks as a major theme for the game's story. In order to allow Edgeworth to be the player character, the first thing he did was "get rid of" Phoenix by having him fall from a bridge into an icy river. He enjoyed writing from another character's perspective, who thought differently from Phoenix; he also used the case to explore the relationship between Edgeworth and Gumshoe. For this game, the team had difficulties with exploring Phoenix's girlfriend Dahlia Hawthorne as her design had to fit the protagonist's likes. Wright and Maya happened to be Takumi's favorite characters to the point he believed he fully understood them.

=== Second Ace Attorney trilogy ===
Due to Takumi's desire, Phoenix was given a more informal look (left) in Apollo Justice but was revised again as a veteran attorney, which revisits his original look.

For Apollo Justice, Takumi did not plan to have Phoenix appear in the game, but his colleagues wanted him in the game in some form, which led to him being the accused in the first case in the game. In Apollo Justice, Wright wears a new outfit, as Takumi did not like him as a veteran attorney. He then asked artist Kazuya Nuri to change him to the point of being unrecognizable, and subsequent requests only served to make him look even worse. However, promotional materials quickly revealed Phoenix's identity. Originally, the former protagonist would suffer drinking problems and be actually involved in gambling, but Takumi changed it after receiving advice that the concept would not be appropriate for all ages. Takumi himself also found it more difficult than he had expected to handle such themes in the story. This resulted in Wright just showing a preference for grape juice in general with the poker concept. It was relatively simple to change the concept so that Wright simply enjoyed grape juice, but it took a long time to adjust the gambling concept before it was finalized to be purely competitive with only pride on the line.

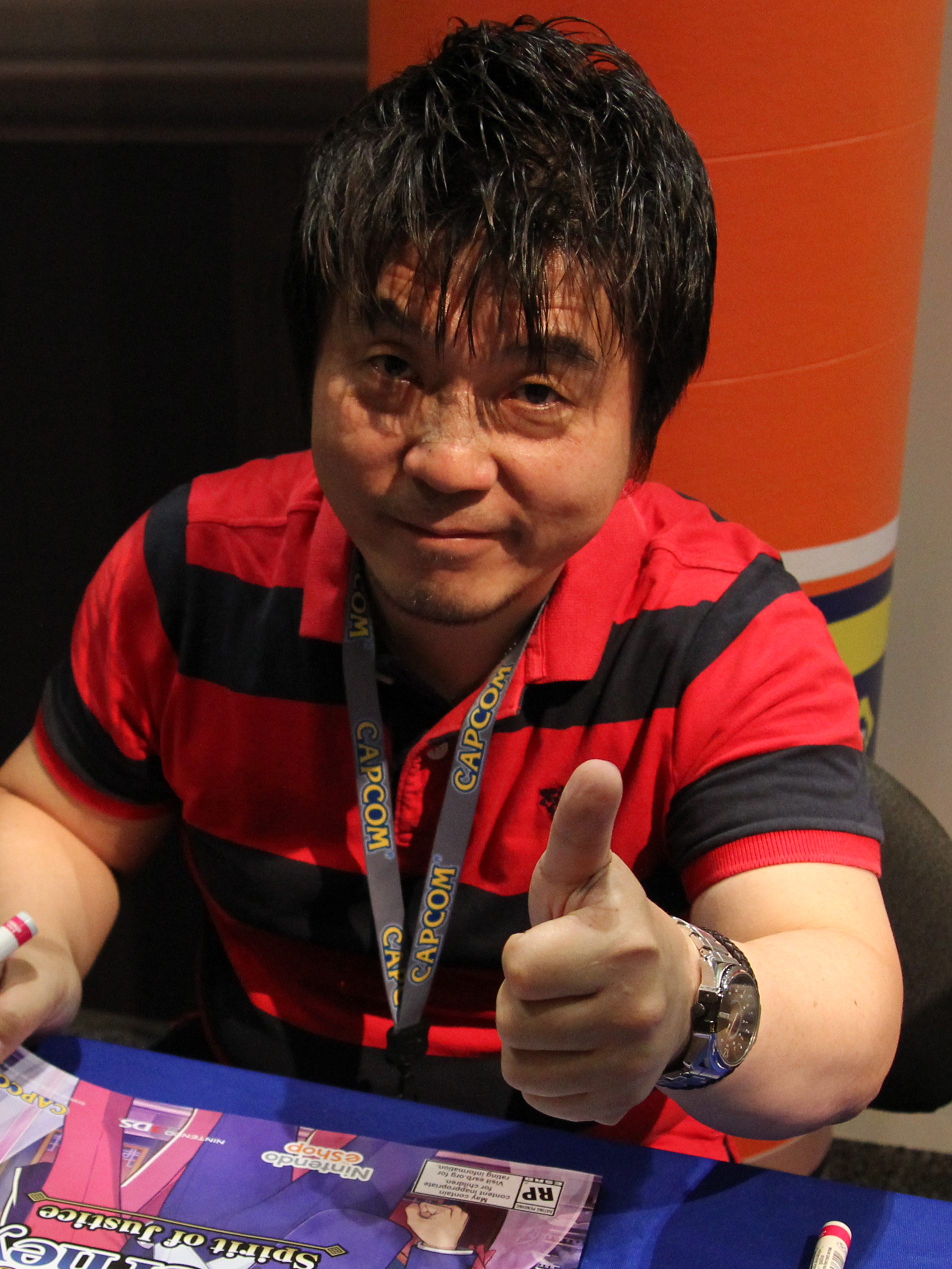
Producer Motohide Eshiro was in charge of bringing Phoenix back as a lead in the second trilogy

For the second game, Phoenix Wright: Ace Attorney Dual Destinies, it was decided Wright's return to law. His role was instead changed to that of the "newbie chief" of the Wright Anything Agency. His new character design had to be similar to his appearance in Trials and Tribulations, while keeping signs that it was set after the first trilogy. Many potential designs were put forward, including versions that had glasses, wore his pendant around his neck, wore a sweater hand-knitted by Trucy, or had a small goatee. It was decided that he should be well-dressed in a suit, but even the design of said suit had many variations. In the end, the game's art director, Takuro Fuse, wanted to make him look older by altering his classic look subtly and giving him a small tuft of his hair poking out in the front. This look was meant to add a little wildness to his design, while the waistcoat and pendant were meant to give an additional air of maturity. The balance between his face and expressions was also tweaked in the illustrations and 3D models for the game. The game's scenario director, Takeshi Yamazaki, felt that Wright is the embodiment of the "revival" theme of Dual Destinies.

Due to Dual Destinies being made long after the previous main game in the series, the developers felt that they needed it to make a big impact; they knew from the start that they wanted Phoenix Wright to return as the game's main character and as an attorney, since they had hinted at it at the end of the previous game. Additionally, they wanted to retain Apollo Justice as an important character and not steal the spotlight from him, as he had already been established as a new main character. Feeling that Apollo's story had not been explored enough in the previous game, they focused on developing his character further in Dual Destinies and added the character Athena Cykes as his junior.

Yamazaki created Athena to be an active partner for Phoenix rather than a "supporter in the background". The development team encountered problems while figuring out how to make the impact they wanted with the game with both Phoenix and Apollo, until they decided on the story concept of Phoenix and Apollo working to revive a collapsed trial system. Miles Edgeworth was brought back as the developers felt that Phoenix needed a character to play off of. They felt that Phoenix had been portrayed as the main character in Dual Destinies, with Apollo just being an important part of the plot, so they set Spirit of Justice in two different countries with one equal main character in each location. The character Rayfa was described by Yamazaki and Eshiro as both a heroine and an opponent to Phoenix; they thought that this approach, as opposed to having the heroine stand by the hero's side, brought something new and fresh to the series. One idea from Capcom was to have Phoenix stand as a lawyer in an underground court that served the likes of the mafia and other underworld inhabitants. The corrupted nature of the setting would make Phoenix have problems trusting his clients to the point of feeling like a fish out of water. The decision to properly portray Phoenix in such game also led to a new character who rivals him in the narrative. However, Capcom said that they aimed to keep the typical comical style Phoenix is often involved with.

=== Casting ===
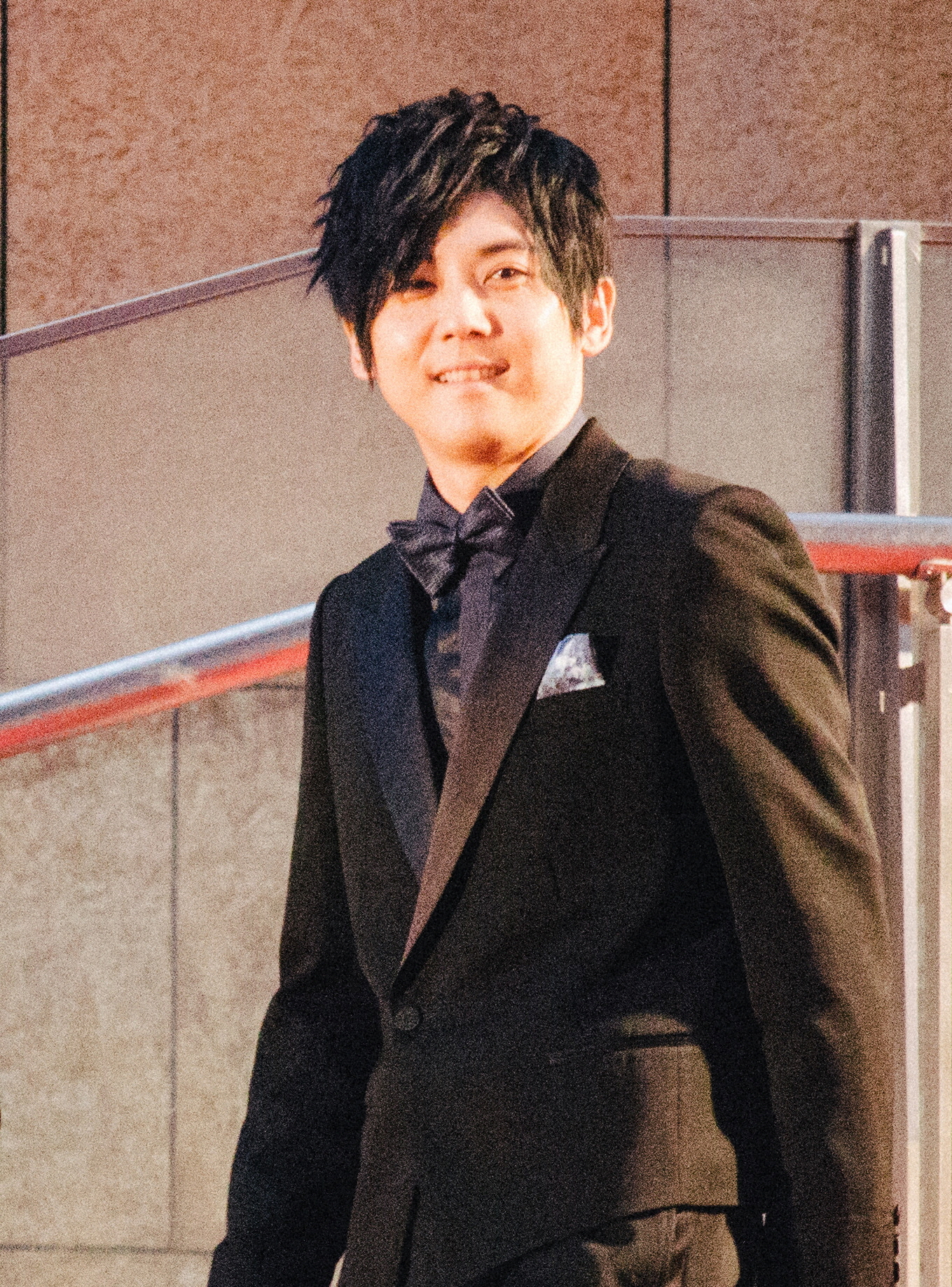
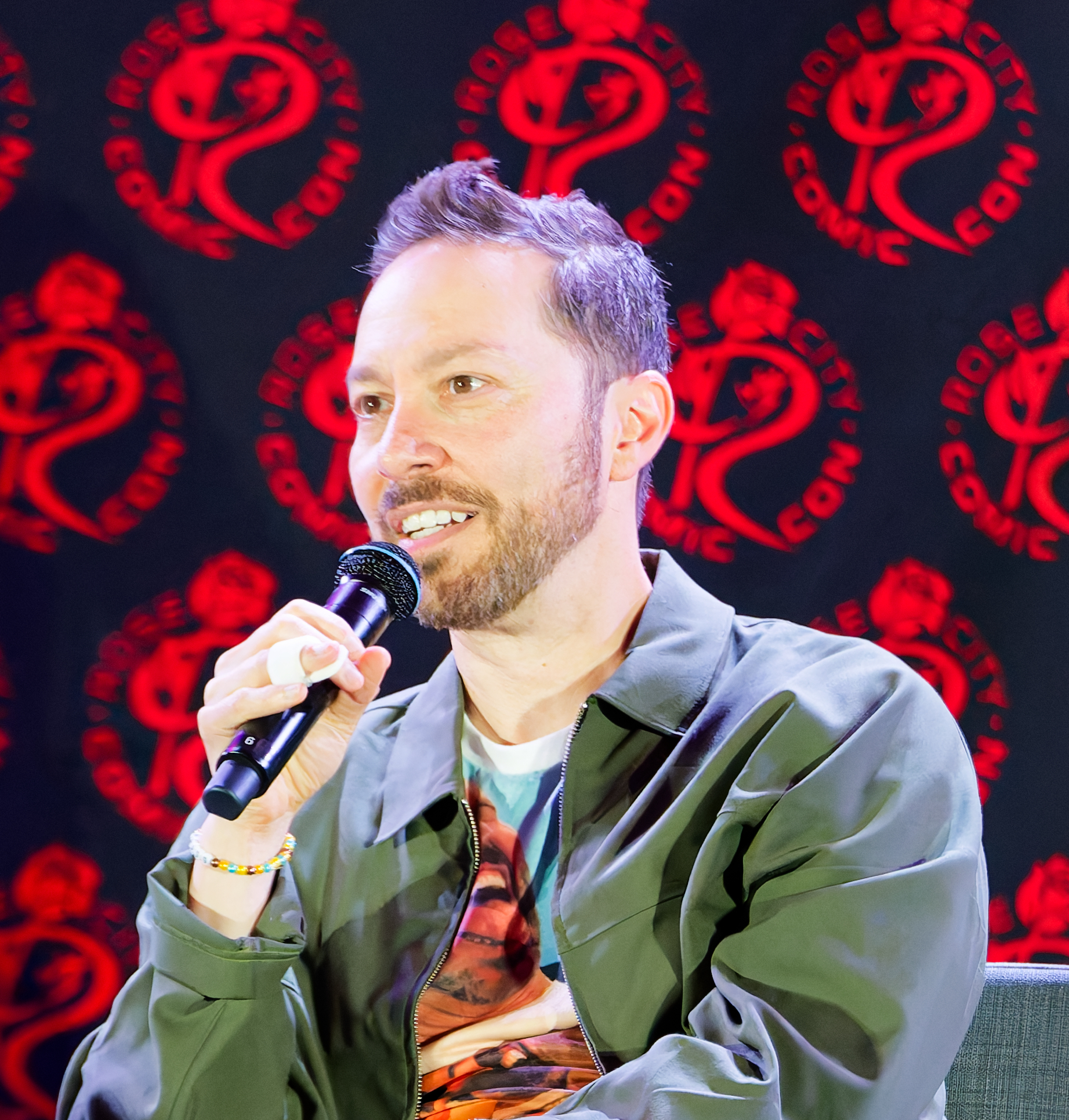
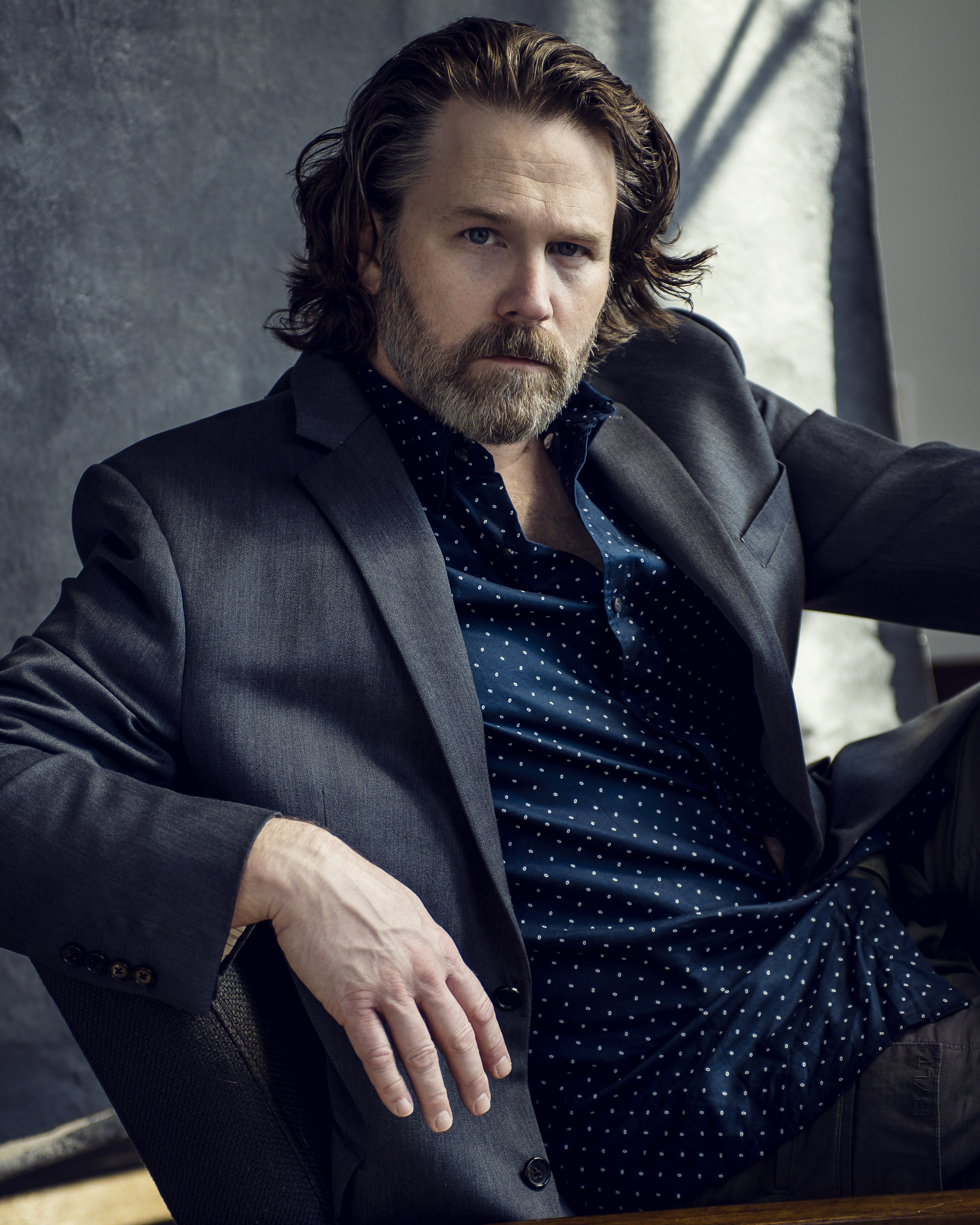
Yuki Kaji (left) voices Phoenix in the anime, while Sam Riegel voices him in the English dub of the game and Eric Vale in the English dub of the TV series.

Sam Riegel has voiced Phoenix since Ultimate Marvel vs. Capcom 3. Riegel took a liking to Phoenix's catchphrases due to the yelling and attention they demand. He also liked the character's outfit and hair for standing out. He noted that Phoenix has a tendency for bluffing until finding a truth behind the cases he works into.

Kaji worked on the first season for half a year, which gave him a certain degree of understanding of the characters and the work. The actor noted the anime had comical reactions, facial expressions, and expressions sprinkled throughout, so he kept Phoenix's sense of justice and freshness in mind, being careful how serious or comical he had to sound. Kaji sees Phoenix as a lawyer with a strong sense of justice in accordance with the law and enjoys being surrounded by sister figures.

== Appearances ==
=== Ace Attorney video games ===
At the time of Phoenix Wright: Ace Attorney, Phoenix is a rookie defense attorney who usually accepts murder cases, attempting to exonerate his clients when there is seemingly incontrovertible evidence and testimony against them. Described as "goofy and single-minded", he often encounters unusual situations. Rather than simply arguing his case, Phoenix uses detective skills to gather relevant evidence and investigate the crime scene. Phoenix must also contend with the loss of his mentor and fellow defense attorney, Mia Fey. Throughout the game, Phoenix is hired to defend various people accused of murder, including his friend Larry Butz and Mia's younger sister Maya Fey. The game culminates with Phoenix defending rival prosecutor Miles Edgeworth from being convicted for the murder of Robert Hammond, an old defense attorney who was involved in the DL-6 case, wherein Edgeworth's father was murdered. Going up against Edgeworth's mentor, Manfred von Karma, Phoenix successfully defends his friend and clears him of all charges, destroying von Karma's 40-year-long winning streak and revealing his crimes as the real culprit behind DL-6. Phoenix's reason for defending Edgeworth originates from their school years where Phoenix was falsely accused of stealing money from his fellow student and Edgeworth was the only one who defended him.

In Phoenix Wright: Ace Attorney – Justice for All, Phoenix once again defends Maya and faces the prosecutor and daughter of Manfred von Karma, 18-year-old legal prodigy Franziska. In the game's climax, Maya is kidnapped by a hitman, forcing Phoenix to make the true killer admit his guilt, which results in his first loss (however, this didn't affect his career negatively). Throughout the course of the game, Phoenix receives a magic Magatama from Pearl that is able to reveal whether a person is hiding a secret in their heart, involving the use of Psyche Locks.

In Phoenix Wright: Ace Attorney – Trials and Tribulations, it is revealed that Phoenix was framed for the murder of his girlfriend's ex-lover while in college. He was defended by Mia Fey, who had not taken a case since her first against Edgeworth the year before. Mia exposes the true murderer as Phoenix's girlfriend, Dahlia Hawthorne, who is later executed. Phoenix must also contend with a fake "Phoenix" who posed as him in court and gets his friend and former client, Maggey Byrde, a guilty verdict. Phoenix also faces the mysterious Godot, a prosecutor who appears to harbor a grudge against him. It is revealed in the final case that during his years at university, he was dating Iris, a temple nun and Dahlia's twin, who posed as her sister to protect Phoenix from Dahlia's wrath.

During a case seven years prior to the events of Apollo Justice: Ace Attorney, two months after Trials and Tribulations, Phoenix was forced to forfeit his attorney's badge after presenting evidence that, unbeknownst to him, was forged. Two weeks later, he adopted Trucy Enigmar after her father and his client, Shadi Enigmar, became a fugitive. Trucy then renamed his office the "Wright Talent Agency", becoming its CEO and one half of the represented talent, with Phoenix being the other half. Phoenix continues to work behind the scenes, helping to bring the truth behind his disbarment to light as well as implement a jury system in the fictional justice system. At the time Apollo Justice takes place, he works as a pianist and plays poker at the Borscht Bowl Club. After being accused of murder himself and being successfully defended by rookie defense attorney Apollo Justice, he hires Apollo, reopening his law office as the "Wright Anything Agency". Wright uses the "MASON System" computer program to assist the player in piecing together the evidence from both past and present for the game's final case, where the circumstances regarding the day he was disbarred are finally revealed.

Wright returns as the protagonist in the fifth main series installment, Phoenix Wright: Ace Attorney – Dual Destinies. Having regained his attorney's badge, he works on cases with Apollo Justice, striving to put the "Dark Age of the Law" to an end once and for all. After clearing his name, Phoenix retakes the bar exam, regaining his badge and once again becoming a defense attorney. He also retains Apollo Justice as a protégé and Athena under his wing as the newest junior attorney for the Wright Anything Agency. When Pearl comes to visit, she reveals to Apollo that she sees Phoenix as a surrogate father and Trucy as her sister due to Phoenix and Maya having raised her following her mother's arrest, with Phoenix paying for her boarding high school education.

In the sixth game in the series, Phoenix Wright: Ace Attorney – Spirit of Justice, Phoenix travels to the Kingdom of Khura'in, where he reunites with Maya Fey and discovers that defense attorneys are reviled throughout the kingdom, having a reputation for abiding criminals. He successfully defends his young tour guide and Maya when they are both accused of murder, putting himself at severe risk of falling prey to the Kingdom's Defense Culpability Act, which states that defense attorneys of parties found guilty are to receive the same sentence as their client. Phoenix's actions begin turning the wheels of revolution when he encounters a rebel group known as the Defiant Dragons and finds out that their leader, a once-renowned defense attorney named Dhurke Sahdmadhi, aims to restore the legal system to its proper state.

=== Other appearances ===
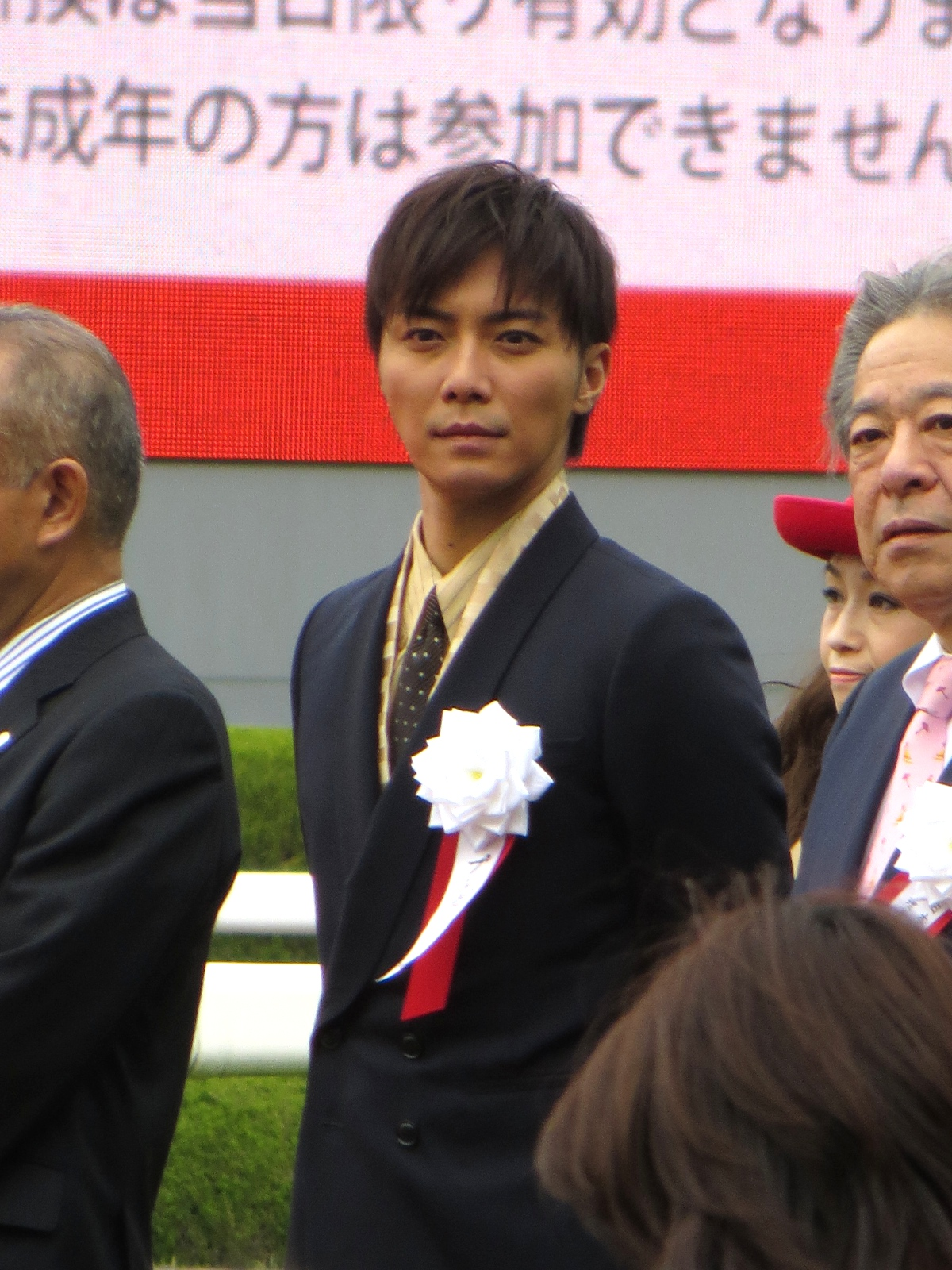
Hiroki Narimiya portrayed Phoenix in the 2012 film.

Phoenix Wright appears in a Japanese manga adaptation of the series. A Japanese musical based on the series, Ace Attorney – Truth Resurrected, staged by the all-female troupe Takarazuka Revue, cast actor Tomu Ranju as Phoenix Wright, using the English name rather than the Japanese "Ryūichi Naruhodō", featuring Phoenix in a romantic relationship with Leona Clyde, an original character based on Lana Skye and Miles Edgeworth. A sequel, Ace Attorney 2 – Truth Resurrected, Again, was produced after the first musical sold out on the first day. Three Japanese stage plays have additionally been performed by the Super Eccentric Theater in which Sho Kato portrays Phoenix.

Hiroki Narimiya portrays Phoenix in the 2012 live-action film Ace Attorney. The film loosely adapts the events of the first game, including Phoenix's first case, his meeting with Maya, and his defense of Edgeworth; the end credits sequence additionally adapts elements of the second game. Phoenix appears as the lead character of the 2016 Ace Attorney anime series, which adapts the events of the first three games in the series over two seasons. He is voiced by Yūki Kaji in Japanese and Eric Vale in English.

Within his own series, Phoenix makes a cameo appearance in Ace Attorney Investigations: Miles Edgeworth, a game starring his longtime rival Miles Edgeworth, as well as in its sequel, Ace Attorney Investigations 2: Prosecutor's Gambit, exploring Europe with Maya Fey. He also stars alongside Professor Hershel Layton in the 2012 Nintendo 3DS crossover title, Professor Layton vs. Phoenix Wright: Ace Attorney, developed by Level-5; in the Japanese dub of the game, Narimiya reprised his role from the live-action film.

The developers of the crossover fighting game Tatsunoko vs. Capcom: Ultimate All-Stars had wanted to include Phoenix, along with Franziska von Karma, as a character on the roster but had trouble designing additional moves besides his finger-pointing gesture. Though they had come up with an attack that used his catchphrase "Igiari!" ("Objection!" in English), with the letters themselves used to attack the opponent, they found that localization would have changed the four-character phrase (in kanji) to a nine-letter word and would have unbalanced the game. Phoenix was also considered for inclusion as a playable fighter in Marvel vs. Capcom 3: Fate of Two Worlds, appearing alongside Miles Edgeworth as a cameo in She-Hulk's arcade mode ending. He appears as a playable character in Ultimate Marvel vs. Capcom 3. His fighting style sees him gather evidence on the field, which he can use to either attack his opponent or save for a powerful courtroom confrontation. Takumi oversaw Phoenix's lines when the character was added to Ultimate Marvel vs. Capcom 3 and was in joy after seeing the final product.

Phoenix, along with Franziska von Karma, Mia Fey, and Miles Edgeworth, appear as cards in the game SNK vs. Capcom: Card Fighters DS. Both Phoenix and his assistant Maya Fey also appear as a two-in-one solo unit in the crossover tactical role-playing game Project X Zone 2. The character is also set to appear in Street Fighter 6 as part of a Battle Pass. Phoenix Wright appeared as a In-game skin in Among Us on the February 18th 2026, it was available for a limited time up to March 17th 2026, there was also a Miles Edgeworth skin that was available for a limited time on September 9th 2024.

== Reception ==
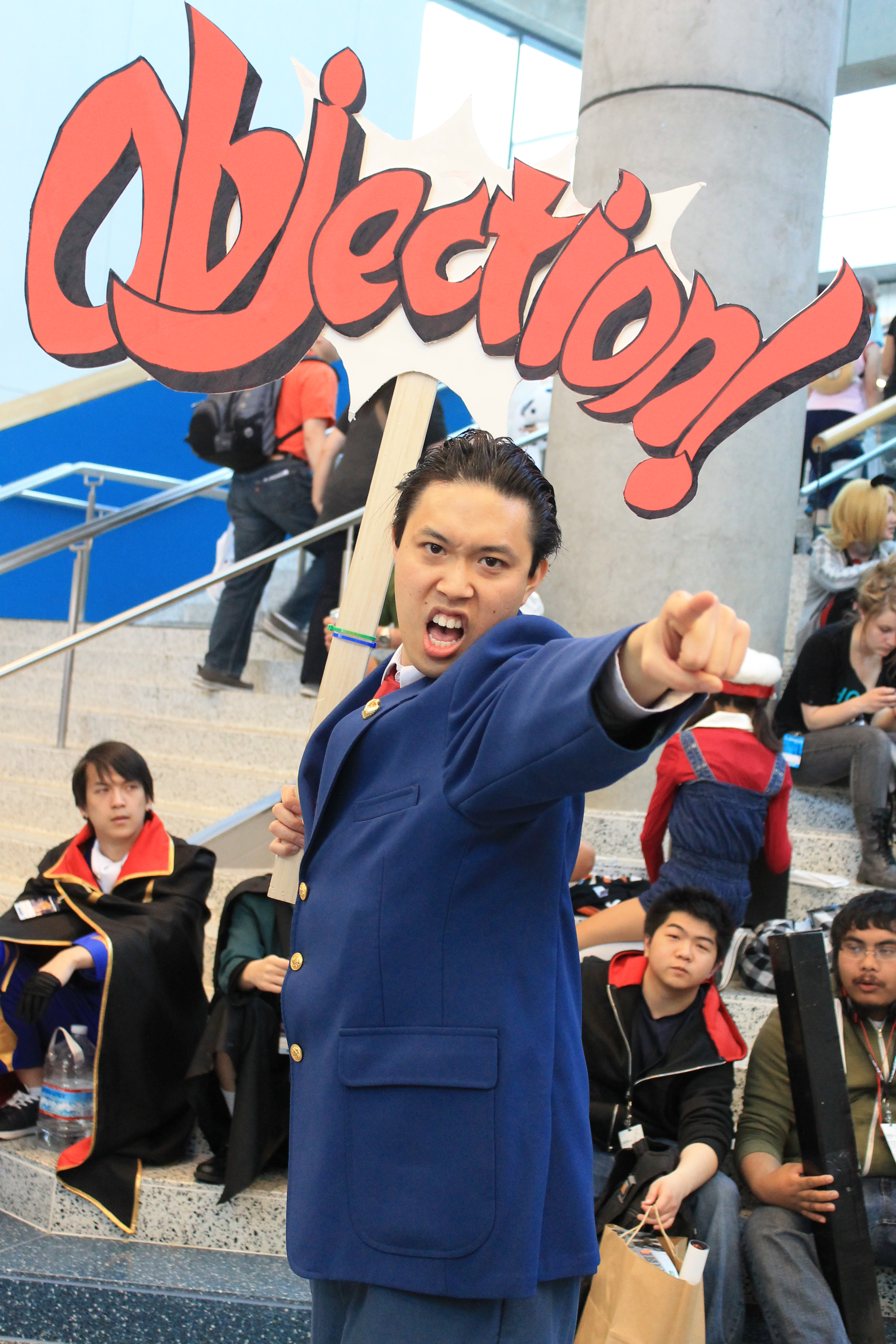
A Phoenix Wright cosplayer emulating the famous mannerism of raising his arm while yelling.

=== Original Ace Attorney trilogy ===
Phoenix Wright has generally been praised by critics for being a likeable character with a realistic profession as well as an appealing design. In 2012, GamesRadar ranked him as the 55th best hero in video games. GamesRadar also included him in a list of "[t]he 30 best Capcom characters of the last 30 years", remarking that he has no power and "isn't even that good of a lawyer when he starts out, but watching him grow is part of why we love him." Jason Mecchi of Screen Rant complimented how, despite how "it would be easy for Phoenix to fade into the background" as the protagonist and perspective character of the game and its first two sequels, there are people who love the "goofy, insightful defense attorney whose earliest cases form the backbone of the first game in the series", concluding to praise the character's "unique and often humorous perspective of the world" despite a general lack of a "dramatic arc" and ranking him as the "most memorable" character in the game. Phoenix Wright's signature mannerisms, such as finger-pointing and cries of "Objection!", have become well-known, and were parodied in episodes of anime such as The Melancholy of Haruhi Suzumiya, Panty & Stocking with Garterbelt, No Game No Life and Maria Holic.

The way Phoenix solves cases was found realistic by Fanbyte due to the handling of bluffs which lead to proper evidence. This is further explored when the protagonist develops sensory abilities which symbolise higher skills of observation when dealing with other people. Regarding the third title, Nintendo Life noted that Phoenix falls into a major tragedy during his college years for dating and loving a woman who was actually manipulating him to have him framed for murder. During Phoenix's work as an attorney, the further exploration of the characters involved leave the player, Phoenix and his friends a sense of defeat. In contrast, his rivalry with Edgeworth is interpreted by some fans as romantic based on the narration used, which inspired the LGBTQ+ community when creating their own games. In one exchange between the two rivals, in which Edgeworth mentions that seeing Phoenix's return gave him unnecessary feelings, is famous for being taken out of context as a subtle hint of Edgeworth being in love, something that heavily appealed to the LGBTQ+ community. Inverse regarded Phoenix and Edgeworth as being one of the most famous duos in gaming as a result of their close relationship, despite the two never forming something intimate and the franchise avoiding romance between any of its main characters, that the article's authors find disappointingly insufficient for the desired LGBTQ+ representation.

=== Second Ace Attorney trilogy ===
There was also commentary about older Phoenix's portrayal in the second trilogy of Ace Attorney games, despite his notoriety in Apollo Justice as a result of him losing his Attorney badge. In a retrospective feature, Rock Paper Shotgun claimed Apollo "never quite gets out from under Phoenix's shadow to completely hold court on his own two feet" and that Phoenix still had outstanding skills when playing as him. NintendoLife said that despite the bad impressions Phoenix gives in Apollo Justice due to his poor fame and looks, he subverts people's expectations in the first trial, where the main character's mentor is revealed to be connected to him and has him sent to prison instead. GameSpot compared Phoenix with Kazuma Kiryu from Yakuza, as both characters appeared to have retired in this installments and replaced with a younger protagonist but both Capcom and Sega decided to keep using the veteran heroes, which might divide players' reaction depending on their tastes. RPGFan enjoyed Phoenix's portrayal as a father in his relationship with his adoptive daughter Trucy, where he shows several kind and protective moments; At the same time, Trucy helps protect Phoenix in his darkest times. Calling Phoenix "one of gaming's most enduring icons," The Datebook of the San Francisco Chronicle praised Capcom's "dadification" of the character through his adoption of Trucy Wright in the fourth game. Commenting on how his friendly relationship with Edgeworth has been "popularly interpreted as bisexual" and potentially "queer-platonic or romantic" amongst portions of the fan community, the writer proceeded to dedicate the final paragraphs of their op-ed to calling for Capcom to make the relationship canon, stating that "Ace Attorney" fans certainly wouldn't mind [and] Capcom doesn't have to worry about losing sales by canonizing" it. However, the characterisation and design of the older Phoenix Wright seen in Apollo Justice has been criticized as "aloof and inscrutable", with "his character's development [criticised as being] lost along the wayside." With the later release of Dual Destinies, both Eurogamer and Kotaku enjoyed the return of the lawyer as the protagonist, following his supporting role in the previous game, but Kotaku lamented that not much of it really focused on Phoenix's character himself but instead on his partner. GameDaily called him the eighth-greatest Capcom character, citing how he perseveres in the face of hardships. Game Informer claimed that Spirit of Justice has the best storyline in the franchise due to the depth given by the two player characters making them relatable, with the original dynamic between Phoenix and Maya being surpassed by the new Apollo and his aid.

In "Objection!: Ace Attorney and the Japanese Criminal Courts", Emmalee A. Ellison from Marshall University notices Phoenix, Apollo and Athena stand out in the games thanks to their colorful designs. Phoenix's constant rivalries with prosecutors which the former always stays behind his opponent were compared with real depictions in Japan as "many Japanese prosecutors likely do hold perfect or near-perfect records, as the conviction rate in Japan is a staggering 99%". Meanwhile, in Apollo Justice Phoenix was noted for attempting to reform the criminal justice system by introducing a jurist system before the actual inclusion in Japan in 2009. This was mostly noted because the game was released in 2007 in Japan in contrast to the latter Western release. In retrospect, since Phoenix Wright was originally intended to be a private investigator instead of a defense attorney, the leftover gameplay elements give the player to build his own case and then compete against the prosecutors who created their own cases. In the book What is Game?, Phoenix's decision to defend Miles Edgeworth was noted to be approved by the character even if the player is against it; the writer claims it is obligatory to fit the character's behavior. A similar case happens when Phoenix defends Maya in Spirit of Justice and Phoenix will always move forward with the case.

=== Ace Attorney adaptations ===
In regards to Phoenix's role in the live-action Ace Attorney film, Polygon praised the portrayal due to "the notable emotional whiplash that occurs in the movie whenever the protagonist believes he is going to fail and then the atmosphere changes. This is also helped by how faithful the style is to the video game, where the actor manages to copy the video game character's mannerism without issues. While Edgeworth and Mia do not have the same impact as in the original games, Phoenix still feels like a more unique lead in the film, like when there are extreme close-ups to his body". Phoenix was also praised for his actions alongside his friend Larry, as if they "contort their faces and fling their bodies around in Chaplinesque fashion and relishing every movement as they wage all-out warfare on the very concept of subtlety". Kotaku found Phoenix's and Van Karma's actors "spot on". According to Hominis, the Phoenix from the live-action is faithful to the original one, as Hiruki Narumiya played him with his kind and pathetic personality.

In regards to Phoenix's role in the two-season Ace Attorney anime adaptation, in "Why We Love Phoenix Wright: Ace Attorney", Jacob Chapman from Anime News Network noted that people had two different experiences when choosing between playing the visual novel or watching the anime adaptation as a result of how they grasp the protagonist. Phoenix comes across as the opposite of a detective when solving cases: "Instead of starting out with all the evidence and narrowing down a list of suspects based on facts, you start out with the hopeful assumption that your client is innocent and must fight to make the clues match that often fragile belief." Despite the culprits often making obvious statements about their identities, Phoenix is unable to execute justice and instead provide proof of such acts. In contrast, the Phoenix Wright explored in the anime comes across as a more intelligent man comparable to Sherlock Holmes or Conan Edogawa due to the fact that he single-handedly solves all trials, whereas the players are instead dedicated to supporting Maya or Edgeworth. THEM Anime Reviews felt the anime had notable animation issues when featuring the protagonist, and the way the anime adapts the mysteries comes across as hilarious sometimes due to the nature of how Phoenix overlooks cases with Maya's aid.

=== Ace Attorney crossovers ===
His appearance in Ultimate Marvel vs. Capcom 3 was also positively received, with Metro describing him as "the star of the show". Mega Mix commented on the character's appearance in the crossover fighting game Marvel vs. Capcom 3, as he keeps his original mannerism despite encountering famous comic superheroes like Spider-Man or Captain America. The way the gameplay was handled in the crossover was also praised by Mega Mix. However, he comes across as a weak fighter when compared with other characters like Magneto or Vergil. Nevertheless, the character leaves a major impact in the fighting game due to how different he is from others. Phoenix's characterization was also praised by the same writer in other crossover Project X Zone 2 due to his accidental funny comments, like when fellow character X asks him if his Attorney badge comes with firepower or when Phoenix questions whether or not vampires are weak to sun light. Professor Hershel Layton was also derived in part from Phoenix Wright; Akihiro Hino, CEO of Level-5, examined what he believed to be Wright's good and bad points and designed Layton by overcoming what he saw as Wright's bad points. Although the crossover with Professor Layton was due to both main characters lacking the qualities to confront each other, GamesRadar still praised their team-up as it helped to create an innovative entry for their franchises.
