= Nahk =

Nahk may refer to:

- N-acetylhexosamine 1-kinase, an enzyme
- Konstantin Nahk
