= Mitsurugi =

Mitsurugi is a Japanese surname.

== Kanji ==
The name Mitsurugi consists of two elements: mi, whose meaning differs based on the kanji used to write it (for example 美 meaning "beautiful", 三 meaning "three", or 御 meaning "heavenly"), and tsurugi, a kind of sword (which might be written 剣, or with variants like 劔 or 剱).

== People ==
- Motoka Mitsurugi (三剣もとか, born 1972), Japanese manga artist

== Fictional characters ==
- Heishiro Mitsurugi (御剣 平四郎) in the Soulcalibur series of video games
- Tamao Mitsurugi (御剣 珠緒) in the Variable Geo series of video games
- Miles Edgeworth, known as Reiji Mitsurugi (御剣 怜侍) in the original Japanese versions of the Ace Attorney series of video games
- Kyoya Mitsurugi (御剣 響夜) in the light novel series KonoSuba
- Meiya Mitsurugi (御剣 冥夜) in the visual novel series Muv-Luv
