= Ace Attorney Investigations: Miles Edgeworth =

2009 video game

- North American cover art featuring (left to right) Miles Edgeworth, Dick Gumshoe, Kay Faraday, and Shi-Long Lang
- Developer: Capcom
- Publisher: Capcom
- Director: Takeshi Yamazaki
- Producer: Motohide Eshiro
- Designer: Yuki Nakamura
- Artist: Tatsuro Iwamoto
- Writers: Takeshi Yamazaki; Sou Mayumi; Yuichirou Kitaoka
- Composers: Noriyuki Iwadare; Yasuko Yamada
- Series: Ace Attorney
- Platforms: Nintendo DS; Android; iOS
- Release: Nintendo DS: JP: May 28, 2009; NA: February 16, 2010; AU: February 18, 2010; EU: February 19, 2010; Android, iOS: WW: December 8, 2017
- Genre: Adventure
- Mode: Single-player

Ace Attorney Investigations: Miles Edgeworth (Note: Known in Japan as Gyakuten Kenji (逆転検事, lit. Turnabout Prosecutor)) is a 2009 adventure video game developed and published by Capcom. It was originally released for the Nintendo DS in Japan in 2009, and internationally in 2010, and later for iOS and Android in 2017. It is the fifth game in the Ace Attorney series, and is set between the events of the third and fourth games, Phoenix Wright: Ace Attorney – Trials and Tribulations and Apollo Justice: Ace Attorney.

While previous games in the series focus on defense attorneys, Ace Attorney Investigations has the player control prosecutor Miles Edgeworth, who investigates five cases that tie together to form an overarching story about a smuggling ring. The game consists of investigation phases, in which the player investigates crime scenes in search for evidence, and rebuttal phases, in which they confront other characters, to hear what they think has happened; the player is able to use evidence to find contradictions in the characters' statements, to get closer to the truth.

The game was directed by Takeshi Yamazaki and produced by Motohide Eshiro. Eshiro had come up with the idea of a new adventure game about Ace Attorney characters while working on Trials and Tribulations, and Yamazaki had the idea to have it be about deductive reasoning and crime scene investigation. The game was specifically designed to be different from previous Ace Attorney titles, with a larger focus on the environment. The development team had originally considered using Ema Skye, a character from earlier games in the series, as the lead character, but used Miles Edgeworth instead because of his popularity. They aimed to have players be immersed in the game and feel like they are Edgeworth, as opposed to previous Ace Attorney games, where they felt players merely could identify with the lead characters; to do this, they included direct control of Edgeworth, and a gameplay element that involves connecting his thoughts.

It was met by generally favorable reviews, with a common complaint being that rebuttals at times devolve into trial and error. The game was one of the best selling games of 2009 in Japan, while Western sales were described as "poor at best". After the game's release, a manga series based on it has been released. A sequel, Ace Attorney Investigations 2: Prosecutor's Gambit, was released in Japan in 2011. Both games were remastered as part of the Ace Attorney Investigations Collection compilation release in 2024.

== Gameplay ==
An investigation phase, where the player searches for evidence

Ace Attorney Investigations is a single-player adventure game in which players control prosecutor Miles Edgeworth, who investigates five cases. The game is mostly presented from a third-person perspective, occasionally switching to a first-person view when examining evidence. Each case involves playing through several investigation phases and rebuttal phases.

During investigation phases, players control Edgeworth directly, either with the D-pad, or by sliding the map that is displayed on the bottom screen. The player has Edgeworth walk around crime scenes in search for evidence; they also meet witnesses and suspects during these phases, who they can talk to. As Edgeworth notices various things in the crime scene, they are saved as Edgeworth's thoughts. Using the "logic" function, the player can connect two such thoughts to gain new information; for instance, by connecting two bullet holes with a gun that has only been fired once, Edgeworth will conclude that two guns must have been at the crime scene. At some points, the player is able to control a cursor to examine parts of the crime scene; by using the "deduction" function at these points, the player is able to point out a contradiction between the crime scene and evidence. If the player successfully points out a contradiction, they gain access to new information. At certain points, a device called Little Thief can be used to create hologram reproductions of the crime scene; by investigating these reproductions, the player can discover new information that would otherwise be hidden. As more evidence is uncovered, the hologram is updated. After having examined an area sufficiently, the investigation phase ends, and the game moves on to a rebuttal phase.

The rebuttal phases work quite similarly to the cross-examination phases from the original games. A witness or a rival character provides their idea of what has happened. The player is able to press them for details, and can present relevant pieces of evidence that contradict what the witness or rival is saying. By doing this, the player gets closer to the truth; it is through confronting suspects during these phases that the player solves the cases. Upon solving a case, the episode is cleared and a new episode is made available to the player. If the player makes mistakes throughout the game, such as presenting wrong pieces of evidence, attempting to connect two thoughts that do not match up, or making incorrect choices, a green gauge called the Truth Gauge decreases, representing Edgeworth getting further from the truth. If it is completely emptied, the game ends. By clearing an investigation phase, half of the gauge is restored, and by clearing an episode, the gauge is restored completely.

== Synopsis ==
=== Setting and characters ===
Ace Attorney Investigations takes place between the third and fourth games in the series, Phoenix Wright: Ace Attorney – Trials and Tribulations and Apollo Justice: Ace Attorney. The story is split into five episodes, each focusing on a different crime; though told out of sequence, the cases tie together to form an overarching story revolving around an international smuggling ring. While previous Ace Attorney games feature defense attorneys Phoenix Wright and Apollo Justice as the lead characters, Ace Attorney Investigations features prosecutor Miles Edgeworth, who was Phoenix's rival in previous games. Among the supporting characters are Kay Faraday, who claims to be the Yatagarasu, a legendary thief who works to expose illegal corporate dealings, and detective Dick Gumshoe, Edgeworth's long-time partner. Recurring rivals of Edgeworth's are Shi-Long Lang, an Interpol agent from the fictional country of Zheng Fa who bears a fierce hatred of prosecutors and the courts after his family's reputation was tarnished by a corrupt prosecutor, and his assistant Shih-na. Other characters include prosecutor Byrne Faraday, detective Tyrell Badd, and defense attorney Calisto Yew. Returning characters from previous Ace Attorney games include prosecutor Manfred von Karma and his daughter Franziska, and forensics student Ema Skye.

=== Plot ===
Cohdopian Embassy secretariat Manny Coachen is accused of murdering Cece Yew, a witness who was to testify against a smuggling ring. Prosecutor Byrne Faraday and detective Tyrell Badd attempt to convict Coachen, but he is acquitted due to a lack of evidence. Feeling that the justice system is powerless to those who stand above the law, Faraday, Badd and Yew's sister Calisto start stealing corporate files detailing illegal or unethical activities and sending them to the media under the alias 'Yatagarasu'.

Three years later, another murder occurs at the embassy. During the trial, in which Faraday is the prosecutor, suspect Mack Rell claims that Faraday is the Yatagarasu and ordered him to commit the murder. A recess is held to replace Faraday with another prosecutor, Miles Edgeworth, due to this accusation; before court reconvenes, both Rell and Faraday are found dead. Edgeworth discovers that Calisto murdered Faraday with Rell's help, then killed Rell and made it look the two had killed each other. Calisto claims to be the Yatagarasu as well as a member of the smuggling ring before fleeing. Faraday's daughter Kay is comforted over his death by Edgeworth and detectives Gumshoe and Badd; she believes her father to be the 'true Yatagarasu', and vows to one day catch Calisto (the 'fake Yatagarasu').

Seven years later, while Edgeworth is traveling on an airliner, an Interpol agent investigating the smuggling ring is murdered during the trip. Upon landing, Prosecutor Franziska von Karma arrives and explains that she is working with Interpol to expose the smuggling ring; she and Edgeworth discover the murderer to be flight attendant Cammy Meele, who is working with the smuggling ring. After landing, Edgeworth is contacted by businessman Ernest Amano, whose son Lance has been kidnapped and is being held for ransom. Edgeworth reunites with Kay, who calls herself the Yatagarasu. They discover the body of Amano family butler Oliver Deacon, and find Lance who identifies Deacon as one of his kidnappers. As Edgeworth investigates the mystery, he meets Interpol agents Shi-Long Lang and Shih-na, who believe that Amano's business group is involved with the smuggling ring; the ring's counterfeit money has ruined the economy of their home country Zheng Fa, so they seek to bring an end to the ring. Edgeworth learns that the kidnapping was a ploy by Lance to get money from his father, and that Lance killed Deacon after the latter had attacked him.

Evidence is found tying Amano to the smuggling ring, and Lang brings him in for questioning. Returning to his office, Edgeworth is confronted at gunpoint by an unidentified man and then finds the body of Detective Buddy Faith inside. He determines that the murderer was Jacques Portsman, a prosecutor working for the smuggling ring who broke into Edgeworth's office to steal evidence from Byrne's murder case, murdering Faith after being caught; however, Edgeworth works out that Portsman was not the man he encountered at gunpoint.

The next day, the countries of Allebahst and Babahl, which formerly made up Cohdopia, prepare to announce their reunification when their shared embassy is set ablaze and two people are killed. The bodies are found in the embassies' respective offices; one of them is Manny Coachen, now the secretariat for Babahl. After investigating, Edgeworth exposes Shih-na as Calisto in disguise; she admits that she attempted to frame Kay for Coachen's murder but insists that she did not murder the secretariat. As she is taken away, Badd reveals that he has since figured out that "Calisto Yew" was an alias (Cece didn't have a sister), and that she became part of the Yatagarasu on orders from the smuggling ring's leader. He also reveals that he was the one who confronted Edgeworth in his office – he was looking for the case file covering Cece Yew's murder.

Edgeworth discovers that the smuggling ring's leader is Quercus Alba, the former Cohdopian and current Allebahstian ambassador, who committed both murders to cover the smuggling ring's tracks. He intended to frame Coachen as the smuggling ring's leader as Coachen had plotted to seize control of the ring himself. After Lang gets Alba's diplomatic immunity revoked, Edgeworth proves his guilt and Alba, Amano and the other smugglers are convicted.

== Development ==
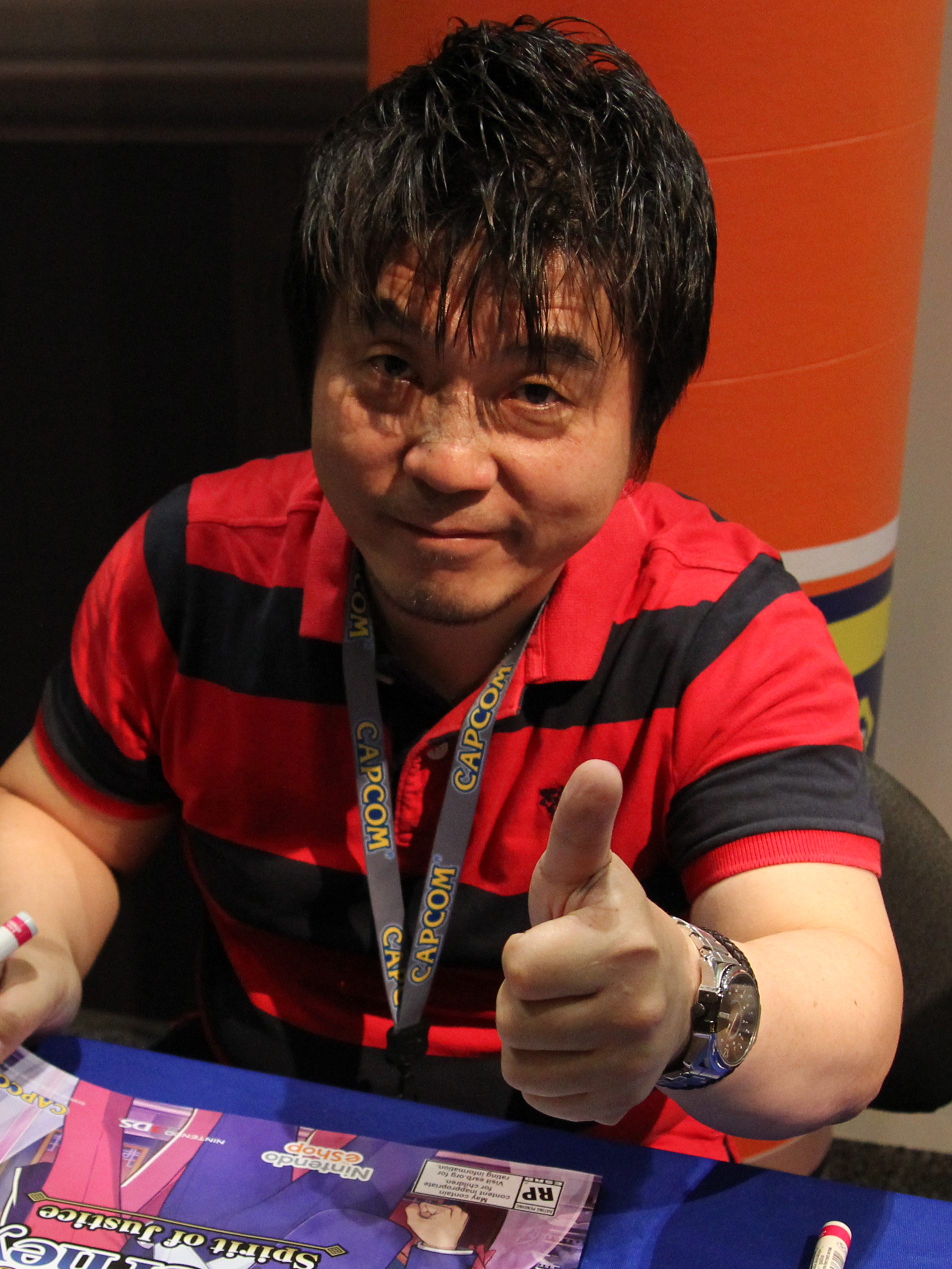
The game was produced by Motohide Eshiro.

The game was directed by Takeshi Yamazaki and produced by Motohide Eshiro, with character designs by Tatsuro Iwamoto, and music by Noriyuki Iwadare and Yasuko Yamada. Eshiro got the idea to make a new game featuring characters from the original Ace Attorney games while working on Trials and Tribulations. According to Eshiro, the game was made for portable play, and has an interface that uses the touch screen; as this could not be replicated on other platforms such as Xbox Live, he said that the Nintendo DS was the platform that was best suited for it, and that no ports to other hardware were planned.

Eshiro said that they could have set the game in a courtroom similar to that of the main series and made a few additions, but that it would not have been very interesting; instead they moved the game to crime scenes, and added several new gameplay elements. Yamazaki was the one who came up with the idea of making a game about deductive reasoning and crime scene investigation. Because of this theme, it made sense to them to include the Ace Attorney character Ema Skye in the game, as she is portrayed as wanting to be a forensic scientist. Yamazaki originally suggested that Ema should be the main character, but based on fan feedback, they decided to use the more popular character Miles Edgeworth instead. Figuring out how to move the game from the courtroom to the crime scene was a challenge for the development team. The team also thought that it was difficult to make the game feel new while also making sure it felt similar to the game series. Because of the new gameplay systems that all had to be created from scratch, Ace Attorney Investigations took longer to develop than previous Ace Attorney games had.

The concept of the story was that while each case is a standalone episode, they are also all interlinked, forming a larger mystery, with each episode revealing a piece of the puzzle. Because Edgeworth is portrayed as a genius prosecutor, whereas Phoenix Wright is a rookie attorney, the development team felt that they needed to come up with incidents that were larger in scale for Ace Attorney Investigations, to match Edgeworth's skill level; therefore, the opponents were made "more formidable" compared to the ones in previous games in the series. Eshiro saw the story as the most important part of the game, and said that, while time-consuming, it was important to make sure that it works. This was accomplished through a lot of trial and error, and several rewrites and revisions: Yamazaki would come up with an idea, which was tested to see if players had a hard time understanding it. Based on feedback from the testers, Yamazaki would rewrite and reorder some parts, and add hints. When creating the game's story, the development team took into account that some players might not have played any Ace Attorney games before. Because of this, they tried to make the game as accessible as possible, and make it playable without first having played any of the previous titles; for instance, the first part of the game is a tutorial that introduces the game and the characters. They did however add in-jokes for players who had played previous Ace Attorney games. Kay Faraday was the first new character that was created for the game, and was cited by Eshiro as one of his favorite characters.

The development team felt that with previous Ace Attorney games, players could identify with Phoenix Wright and Apollo Justice; for Ace Attorney Investigations, they wanted players to be immersed in the game and feel like they are Edgeworth. He said that they think players will feel a connection with Edgeworth and understand his character. As examples of this, Eshiro cited the ability to directly control Edgeworth, and the possibility to see inside his head: the game's logic system was created because the development team wanted to show how Edgeworth thinks. It represents what is happening inside his mind, which Eshiro describes as a "very cool, calm and collected way of thinking". For the rebuttal phases in the game, Eshiro wanted to try out new things that could not be done in courtroom battles: during rebuttals, several characters come in and out during each scene at a rapid pace, providing the player with evidence, to create drama with tension. Ace Attorney Investigations has a larger focus on the environment than previous Ace Attorney titles had; previous titles featured gameplay elements in which the player finds contradictions in suspects' statements, whereas the goal of Ace Attorney Investigations is to find things at the crime scene that contradict the evidence the player has. The game's third person perspective was specifically chosen to be different from the main series' first person perspective, and to show the environment so that players can walk around inside it. The game system was designed specifically for Ace Attorney Investigations, with the aim of being different from the main series; therefore, Eshiro felt that a lot of its features should stay within the Investigations series, and not be used in other Ace Attorney titles.

The development team put effort into trying to make Edgeworth look right; Eshiro described Edgeworth's running animation as "graceful, while exerting effort", while Iwamoto was not entirely convinced and thought it looked like he is "walking really fast accidentally". Eshiro and Yamazaki wanted to add a lot of features to the Little Thief system, but due to time constraints it ended up more simplistic than they had originally envisioned. Eshiro used his experience with producing action games such as Shadow of Rome and laying out scenes to get backgrounds to move smoothly without scrolling issues when Edgeworth moves. The programmers faced big technical challenges and had to make significant modifications to the game when implementing the graphics: in the game, two animated characters - whose graphics each are larger than those in previous Ace Attorney games - appear simultaneously and on top of smaller "mini-avatar" graphics. Eshiro said that he thinks they pushed the graphic processing ability of the Nintendo DS system to its limits for this. Eshiro said that they would consider making DSiWare episodes if demand was high enough, but that they did not have any plans at the time. He said that there were many technical aspects to consider, such as memory limitations for DSiWare.

== Promotion and release ==
The game was announced in Famitsu in April 2008. A demo of the game was made available at Tokyo Game Show 2008. It was also shown at San Diego Comic-Con in 2009, and appeared once more at Tokyo Game Show in 2009.

The game was published by Capcom for the Nintendo DS on May 28, 2009, in Japan, on February 16, 2010, in North America, on February 18, 2010, in Australia, and on February 19, 2010, in Europe. A limited edition version of the game was made available in Japan, containing a business card holder, promotional videos, a CD with five tracks from an Ace Attorney concert performed by the Tokyo Philharmonic Orchestra, a pamphlet from the concert, a game box, and a copy of the game itself. A bundle containing an Ace Attorney Investigations themed Nintendo DSi and a copy of the game was also made available in Japan. An iOS and Android version was released worldwide on December 8, 2017. The soundtrack album Gyakuten Kenji Original Soundtrack was released on June 24, 2009, by Suleputer.

=== Localization ===
For the game's localization, the main focus was to keep the dialogue natural and accessible to Western players, while also staying true to the Japanese version. The Japanese version had several instances of puns or cultural jokes, which would not have worked if they had been translated literally. There were also places in the script where the development team would have liked to insert jokes in the localization, but thought that it may be inappropriate to do so since the joke was not in the Japanese version. The team found difficulties in getting the Western version's tone right, as they wanted to keep the localized text interesting, and at the same time avoid inconsistencies with the original version's tone.

== Reception ==
Reception

Aggregate score
Aggregator	Score
Metacritic	DS: 78/100

Review scores
Publication	Score
Adventure Gamers	3/5
Eurogamer	8/10
GameSpot	8/10
GameZone	7.5/10
IGN	7.6/10
NGamer	79%
Nintendo World Report	8.5/10
TouchArcade	iOS: 4/5

Ace Attorney Investigations was well received by critics. The game sold 172,000 units in the week of its release in Japan, and 42,000 the following week; by the end of 2009, it was the 33rd best selling game of the year in Japan, with 303,445 copies sold. On the other hand, Capcom USA's vice president described Western sales as "poor at best". The game won an Aggie Award for Best Character of 2010, for Miles Edgeworth, and was awarded for Best Adventure Title of 2010 on Nintendo DS by Nintendo World Report. Following the game's appearance at Tokyo Game Show in 2008, it was awarded a Japan Game Award in the "future" category.

Austin Boosinger at Adventure Gamers said that the gameplay changes compared to the main series were mostly superficial, resulting in a game that is similar to but worse than the main series. Neal Ronaghan at Nintendo World Report did on the other hand feel that there had been enough changes for the game to feel fresh, and said that it was possibly the best entry in the Ace Attorney series. Hilary Goldstein at IGN said that the new gameplay elements were strong additions that add variety to the game, but felt that the series was running out of steam. Steven Hopper at GameZone said that the game was very similar to previous Ace Attorney games, on good and bad, and that the Ace Attorney series was starting to show its age. Laura Parker at GameSpot said that the game was a "successful twist" on the gameplay of the previous games in the series, and that it "lacked none of the magic" of them.

Boosinger called the game too easy and streamlined, and found the Logic system to be too simple. He did however feel that finding contradictions in testimonies was "fantastic as always", while too reliant on trial and error. Ronaghan said that many solutions in the Rebuttal phases are "binary" - while it makes sense to present a piece of evidence at several points, the game accepts only one of them. He found the controls to be fine, but called the touch screen-based walking controls "awkward and imprecise". Goldstein similarly found problems with multiple pieces of evidence that all could point to the same contradiction, but where the game would only allow a specific one. At other times, she said that no reasonable solution could be found, forcing her to guess. John Walker at Eurogamer also complained about how reasonable solutions sometimes are not accepted. Hopper said that solving cases isn't intuitive enough, and involves a lot of trial and error. While some puzzles made sense to him, others were frustrating. Parker called the gameplay exciting, and said that the game has depth and variety, but that it is too easy at times.

Boosinger said that while the game retains the comedy of the Ace Attorney series and has great character writing, he found the story to be dull, slow, and too long. Ronaghan called the dialogue funny, and said that the game was well-paced, long, and enjoyable. Goldstein called the story interesting, but said that it at times plays out "like a bad soap opera". Walker appreciated the choice to make Edgeworth the game's lead character, and called Kay a fantastic addition. He found the translation of the game to be incredible, despite a number of spelling mistakes. Hopper appreciated that the game has a new protagonist and setting, and called the dialogue "cheesy but charming". On the other hand, he said that there is a lot of superfluous text in the game, making the cases longer than they need to be. Parker said that it takes some time to get used to playing as Edgeworth, saying that he is not as immediately engaging as Phoenix and Apollo. She called the story deep and intricate, and slow but solid. NGamer praised dialogue as charming, and liked the characters, but thought the game lacked the "hard-hitting melodrama" of previous Ace Attorney games, and that Edgeworth had been made "too nice" compared to previous appearances. Ronaghan called the art style and presentation wonderful, and said that each character "oozes with personality", but that the animation, while better than that in previous titles, was limited to only a few frames at a time. Goldstein called the characters colorful, but found the locations to be uninteresting. Hopper called the game's aesthetic "anime-esque" and clean, and said that the static images were decent. Parker liked the game's presentation, and called the environments "beautifully drawn". NGamer praised the art style.

=== Legacy ===
A manga based on the game, written by Kenji Kuroda and drawn by Kazuo Maekawa, premiered in 2009 in Kodansha's Weekly Young Magazine. Kodansha also released the manga in North America in four volumes between July 31, 2012, and January 29, 2013. The second and third volume ranked 7th and 8th, respectively, on The New York Times Manga Best Seller List for one week each in 2012. In 2011, an attraction based on the game was opened in the amusement park Joypolis in Tokyo. A stage play based on the game ran in July 2016 in Tokyo.

A sequel to the game, Ace Attorney Investigations 2: Prosecutor's Gambit, was released in Japan on February 3, 2011. While there were initially no plans for Capcom to release it internationally, the game was eventually localized as part of the Ace Attorney Investigations Collection, released in September 2024. The compilation, which includes both games, features high-resolution graphics, with the option to choose between newly animated character sprites and the original pixel art, as well as bonus content such as artwork and music. In July 2013, Eshiro said that he and Yamazaki would like to make a third Investigations game, and that he intended to secure the needed Capcom personnel and plan everything out in the future, but that he could not make any promises.
