= N-acetylhexosamine 1-kinase =

Identifiers
- EC no.: 2.7.1.162

Databases
- IntEnz: IntEnz view
- BRENDA: BRENDA entry
- ExPASy: NiceZyme view
- KEGG: KEGG entry
- MetaCyc: metabolic pathway
- PRIAM: profile
- PDB structures: RCSB PDB PDBe PDBsum
Search
- PMC: articles
- PubMed: articles
- NCBI: proteins

N-acetylhexosamine 1-kinase (EC 2.7.1.162, NahK, LnpB, N-acetylgalactosamine/N-acetylglucosamine 1-kinase) is an enzyme with systematic name ATP:N-acetyl-D-hexosamine 1-phosphotransferase. This enzyme catalyses the two related chemical reaction that use adenosine triphosphate (ATP) to transfer a phosphate group to a hexose sugar.

ATP + N-acetyl-D-hexosamine $\rightleftharpoons$ ADP + N-acetyl-alpha-D-hexosamine 1-phosphate

For example, the enzyme characterised from Bifidobacterium longum converts N-acetyl-D-glucosamine to N-acetyl-α-D-glucosamine 1-phosphate:

ATP +
N-acetyl-D-glucosamine
ADP +
N-acetyl-α-D-glucosamine 1-phosphate

Similarly, N-acetylgalactosamine is converted to N-acetyl-α-D-galactosamine 1-phosphate:

ATP +
N-acetylgalactosamine
ADP +
N-acetyl-α-D-galactosamine 1-phosphate

The enzyme is involved in the lacto-N-biose I/galacto-N-biose degradation pathway in this probiotic bacterium. It differs from N-acetylgalactosamine kinase, since it can phosphorylate both N-acetylgalactosamine and N-acetylglucosamine at similar rates and is active on some other sugars.
