= Franziska von Karma =

Ace Attorney character

- Ace Attorney character
- Franziska in Justice for All
- First game: Phoenix Wright: Ace Attorney – Justice for All (2002)
- Created by: Shu Takumi
- Designed by: Tatsurō Iwamoto
- Voiced by: English: Janet Hsu (Justice for All–Prosecutor's Gambit); Jessica Peterson (anime); Japanese: Yukari Suwabe (Justice for All–Prosecutor's Gambit); Saori Yumiba (anime)

In-universe information
- Occupation: Prosecutor
- Family: Manfred von Karma (father); Miles Edgeworth (adoptive brother)

Franziska von Karma, known as Mei Karuma (Japanese: 狩魔 冥, Hepburn: Karuma Mei) in Japanese, is a character in the Ace Attorney series. She first appeared as the rival prosecutor to protagonist Phoenix Wright in Phoenix Wright: Ace Attorney – Justice for All, replacing former rival Miles Edgeworth due to creator Shu Takumi not wanting Edgeworth to continue losing to Phoenix due to Edgeworth's popularity with fans. She wields a whip against Phoenix, witnesses, the Judge, and others, and believes in aspiring for perfection. She professes a desire to defeat Phoenix, ultimately never doing so due in part to her being shot as part of a conspiracy by one of Phoenix's defendants to weaken efforts to prosecute him. Her revenge is revealed to be a desire to surpass Edgeworth, who had never beaten Phoenix before. She reappears in multiple later titles, at times serving as an ally to Edgeworth.

Franziska was created by Shu Takumi and designed by Tatsurō Iwamoto. Takumi expressed that he worked to ensure that characters in Justice for All were more outlandish than the first, expressing his belief that Franziska perfectly demonstrated this. She has received generally positive reception, identified by The Guardian as one of the most interesting female characters in video games. Her relationship with Edgeworth and her father received commentary, as did her use of a whip, which were felt by some critics as either annoying or outlandish.

== Appearances ==
Franziska first appears as the rival prosecutor to protagonist Phoenix Wright in Phoenix Wright: Ace Attorney – Justice for All who has a tendency to use her whip on people and believes in perfection above all else. She is the 18-year-old daughter of Manfred von Karma, one of the major antagonists of the first Phoenix Wright: Ace Attorney, who served as the mentor figure to both her and Miles Edgeworth in their childhood. Franziska, becoming a prosecutor by age 13, travels to Los Angeles and replaces Edgeworth as Phoenix's rival from the first game, and pursues Phoenix's defeat as a matter of revenge. She loses each case against Phoenix, ultimately having to be replaced due to being injured by an assassin to ensure Phoenix's client's victory, whom Phoenix was defending under duress due to the kidnapping of Maya Fey. She ultimately helps prove that his client violated the contract with the assassin, enabling Phoenix to have him found guilty. She leaves in anger after Phoenix is not upset about losing, but vows to continue prosecuting after a conversation with Edgeworth. She later reappears in Trials and Tribulations, filling in for the missing prosecutor Godot during a trial while Edgeworth fills in for Phoenix as defense. She also appears in Ace Attorney Investigations: Miles Edgeworth and its sequel, Prosecutor's Gambit, working with Interpol on an investigation into a smuggling ring and intermittently assisting Edgeworth in his own investigations.

== Concept and creation ==
Franziska von Karma was created by series creator Shu Takumi. She was created to replace Miles Edgeworth for Justice for All as the game's prosecutor. This was due to the feeling that it would be sad if Edgeworth kept losing to Phoenix, due in part to his popularity, choosing instead to have a new opponent for Phoenix. This resulted in him having to rewrite most of the game's dialogue. Takumi discussed how, in the first game, characters were designed to be "real but not real," but the second game's characters were meant to seem "100% out of this world." He felt that Franziska represented that perfectly due to her use of a whip against witnesses, lawyers, and the judge, though he was surprised that no one on staff found the idea ridiculous. She was designed by Tatsurō Iwamoto, who stated that people have said he is not good at drawing girls, though felt that he managed to overcome that perception. Her final scene in Justice for All, where she cries, was not originally planned, though Takumi felt that it may be important, so he commissioned the animation by Iwamoto, thinking she would eventually cry. He quickly created the epilogue after not using the crying animation during the game, in order to use the animation. Iwamoto felt she wouldn't cry like an ordinary girl due to her age. He stated that his research of crying faces was done for Pearl Fey, a young girl, which caused Franziska's crying to seem childish.

Franziska has a tendency to look down on others, calling them fools, giving them "aggravating nicknames," and using her whip on people to get her way or intimidate people. She aspires to prove that she is as great as her father, Manfred von Karma.

In Japanese, Franziska's name, Mei, uses a kanji that means "dark". Localizer Janet Hsu found Franziska particularly enjoyable to write for in Justice for All. Franziska is voiced in English and French by Janet Hsu. In the stage adaptation of Justice for All, Franziska is portrayed by Fujisaki Arisa and Seren Kusunoki. Kusunoki expressed that she was similar to Franziska due to having a tough personality and being unable to be cute, while Arisa felt she was the polar opposite of Franziska. Arisa expressed that she was worried about portraying her due to her popularity. They both watched footage of Franziska to prepare for their role. She is voiced by Miyuki Sawashiro in the drama CD version included in the Phoenix Wright: Ace Attorney Trilogy release.

== Reception ==
Franziska von Karma has received generally positive reception. The Guardian staff regarded Franziska as being among the most interesting female characters in video games, expressing that she was an "incredibly accomplished and intimidatingly intelligent young woman" in spite of her temperament and violence, due in part to managing to pass the bar exam at 13. Rock Paper Shotgun writer Katharine Shotgun regarded her as her favorite prosecutor. She expressed that she did not care for her in Justice for All due to finding her whip use and shouting annoying, but she came to appreciate her when she reappeared in Trials and Tribulations. She appreciated that she came out of it with a more mature view of what it means to be a prosecutor and overcoming her desire to live up to her father. GamesRadar+ writer Mikel Reparaz felt that she was a cool addition to Justice for All initially, but expressed that she became annoying after a while. He compared her to Edgeworth, who he felt developed and became likable in the first game, whereas feeling that her "schtick" was played out by the end of the game. Game Watch writer Asami Rina expressed excitement to see Miles and Franziska face off in court in Trials and Tribulations, stating her enjoyment of seeing scenes in the game besides Phoenix fighting a prosecutor. She stated that she couldn't help but put her fists in the air and yell excitedly when Franziska showed up, and that if it had been Miles vs. Godot, it would have lacked excitement. She felt that the fifth episode in which this scene happened was orchestrated perfectly to make this happen. RPGFan writers Michael Sollosi, Brigid Choi, Keegan Lee, and Stephen Meyerink discussed how Franziska's character had multiple implausibilities, including being relatively young as a prosecutor and whipping the judge in court. Lee found her use of a whip the most implausible, also discussing how she has the "Harry Osborn syndrome" where he stated she blames Phoenix for pointing out her father's misdeeds.
