= Miles Edgeworth =

Video game character

- Ace Attorney character
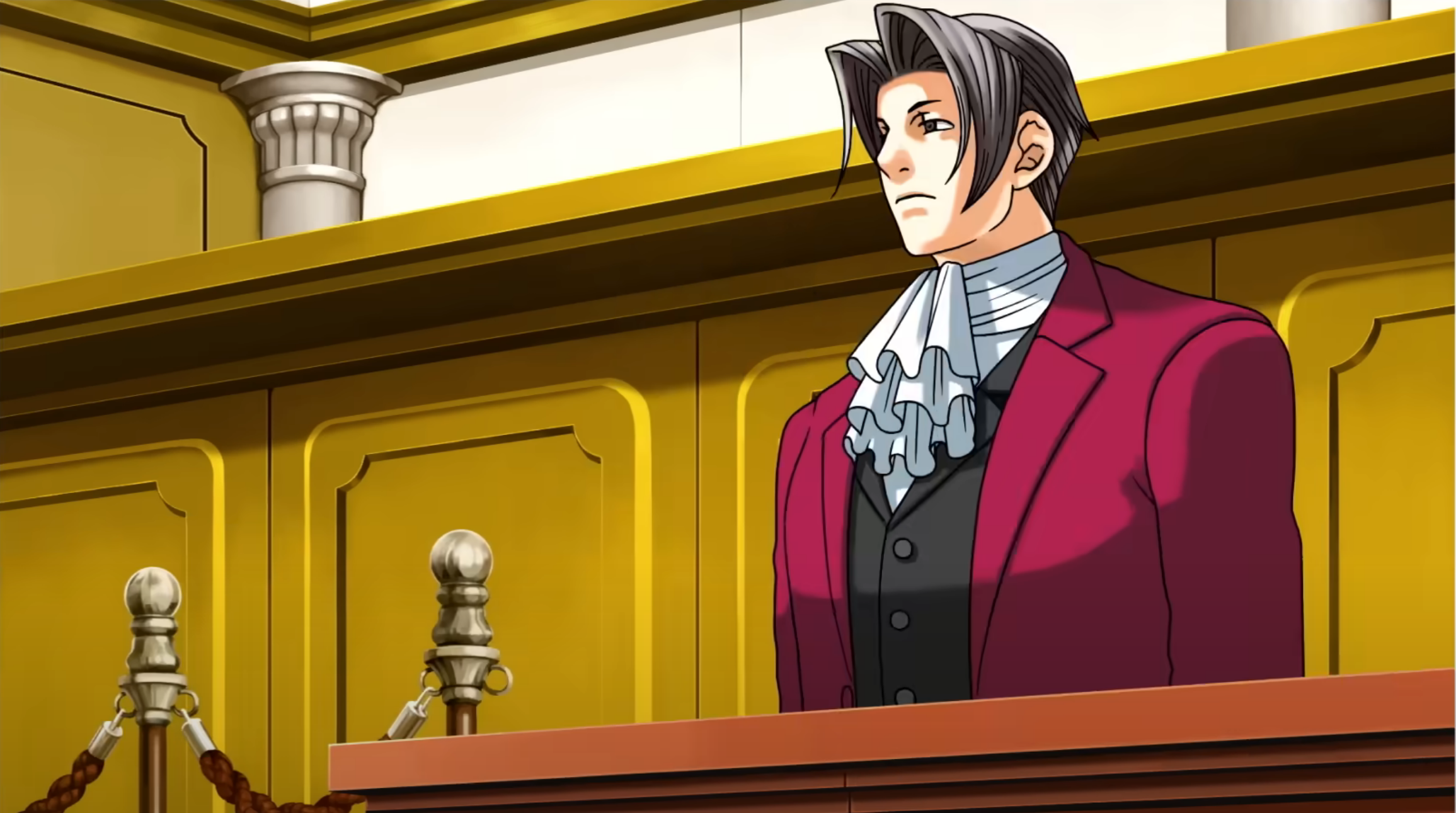
- Miles Edgeworth as he appears in Phoenix Wright: Ace Attorney
- First game: Phoenix Wright: Ace Attorney (2001)
- Created by: Shu Takumi
- Designed by: Tatsurō Iwamoto
- Portrayed by: List: Hikaru Nanaho (2009 musical) Hiro Yūmi (2009 and 2013 musicals) Takumi Saito (2012 film) Roi Hayashi (2012 film, young) Ryo Kobayashi (2021 stage play)
- Voiced by: English: Seon King (Ace Attorney–Prosecutor's Gambit); Kyle Hebert (Dual Destinies, Spirit of Justice); Mark Healy (Professor Layton vs. Ace Attorney); Christopher Wehkamp (anime); Apphia Yu (anime, young); Japanese: Tatsuro Iwamoto (Ace Attorney, Justice for All, Trials and Tribulations); Eiji Takemoto (Dual Destinies, Professor Layton vs. Ace Attorney, Project X Zone 2, Spirit of Justice); Masashi Tamaki (anime)

In-universe information
- Occupation: Prosecutor
- Family: Gregory Edgeworth (father); Manfred von Karma (adoptive father); Franziska von Karma (adoptive sister)

Miles Edgeworth, known as Reiji Mitsurugi (Japanese: 御剣 怜侍, Hepburn: Mitsurugi Reiji) in original Japanese language versions, is a fictional prosecutor in Ace Attorney, a visual novel adventure video game series created by Japanese company Capcom. Introduced as a cold-hearted perfectionist, he is the antagonistic rival to main character Phoenix Wright in Phoenix Wright: Ace Attorney (2001). Following the events of the first game, the character has a change of heart and reappears as a friendly rival in most subsequent entries. Created by Shu Takumi and designed by Tatsurō Iwamoto, Edgeworth was more difficult for Takumi to create compared to Phoenix.

Edgeworth went on to star in two of his own spin-off games, Ace Attorney Investigations: Miles Edgeworth (2009) and its sequel; appeared in extended Ace Attorney media, such as film and animation; and made several cameo appearances in titles outside of the main Ace Attorney series. He has been generally well received by critics and fans, identified as one of the best new video game characters of the 2000s by GamesRadar+. The relationship between Phoenix and Edgeworth has also been the subject of critical commentary.

== Appearances ==
Edgeworth's first appearance was in Phoenix Wright: Ace Attorney, where he is introduced as an antagonist prosecutor with a perfect record, who would do anything to win a trial; he is presented as respectable, but cold and ruthless. Throughout the game, the perception of Edgeworth changes, starting in episode three when he, for reasons then unknown, suddenly helps Wright to corner a witness. In the next episode, Edgeworth finds himself accused of murder, and Wright defends him on detective Dick Gumshoe's request against Manfred von Karma, Edgeworth's austere adoptive father and mentor, who won every case in his 40-year prosecutorial career. It is revealed during this episode that Wright and Edgeworth, along with Larry Butz, were childhood friends, and that Manfred von Karma murdered Miles's father, the defense attorney Gregory Edgeworth, and raised Miles as a prosecutor under his wing as revenge for a minor penalty tarnishing his otherwise spotless record. Edgeworth blamed himself for his father's death, a fact that led to him becoming a prosecutor instead of a defense attorney. In "Rise from the Ashes", a fifth episode included in all subsequent editions of Phoenix Wright: Ace Attorney, he is plagued by rumors about his past as a prosecutor, abandoning his job and disappearing. He returns in Phoenix Wright: Ace Attorney – Justice for All, having figured out what it means to be a prosecutor. He assists Phoenix and his adoptive sister, Franziska von Karma, the prosecutor of that game in taking down the final villain of the game. He appears again in Phoenix Wright: Ace Attorney – Trials and Tribulations in Phoenix's place on his request when Phoenix becomes incapacitated. The game also shows Edgeworth's first case as a prosecutor, where he faces off against Mia Fey.

Edgeworth gained a starring role in the spin-off Ace Attorney Investigations: Miles Edgeworth, in which he investigates murders relating to a smuggling ring. During the course of the game, he meets Kay Faraday, a young self-proclaimed "great thief", who acts as his assistant in a similar vein to Maya. A flashback case focuses on a younger Edgeworth investigating a case early in his career, explaining how he and Detective Dick Gumshoe first met. In Ace Attorney Investigations 2: Prosecutor's Gambit, Edgeworth comes under fire by the Committee for Prosecutorial Excellence, who seek to have him stripped of his badge. Edgeworth begins investigating cases tied to a larger conspiracy and cover-up, including the last case his father took before his murder, and struggles between his life path of becoming a defense attorney like his father, or continuing as a prosecutor.

Edgeworth returns as a friendly rival in Phoenix Wright: Ace Attorney – Dual Destinies and Phoenix Wright: Ace Attorney – Spirit of Justice, with Dual Destinies set eight years after Trials and Tribulations. Now promoted to Chief Prosecutor, Edgeworth assists Phoenix in solving mysteries in each game and serves as a prosecutor in a limited capacity, filling in for Simon Blackquill and Nahyuta Sahdmadhi respectively.

=== Adaptations ===
Edgeworth has appeared in other media adaptations of Ace Attorney. In the Japanese Ace Attorney stage musical Ace Attorney – Truth Resurrected, staged by the all-female troupe Takarazuka Revue, Asahi Miwa portrays Leona Clyde, an original composite character based on Edgeworth and Lana Skye, depicted as Phoenix Wright's love interest, who defended him in his childhood class trial as a young girl in place of Edgeworth. While Edgeworth is also present in the musical and its sequel Ace Attorney 2 – Truth Resurrected, Again (in which Leona is established to have died) as a separate minor character, respectively portrayed in each by Hikaru Nanaho and Hiro Yūmi, he is merely a rival to Wright with no personal connection to him.

Takumi Saito portrays Edgeworth in the 2012 live-action film Ace Attorney, loosely adapting his role in the first game; Roi Hayashi plays Edgeworth as a child. Edgeworth appears in the 2016 Ace Attorney anime series, which adapts the events of the first three games in the series; he is voiced by Masashi Tamaki in Japanese and Christopher Wehkamp in English. Edgeworth also appears as a recurring character in the Phoenix Wright: Ace Attorney manga series, as well as the main character of its spinoff series, Ace Attorney Investigations: Miles Edgeworth.

=== Other media ===
Miles Edgeworth makes a brief cameo in She-Hulk's ending cutscene in Ultimate Marvel vs. Capcom 3, in which Phoenix Wright is a playable character.

Edgeworth makes a cameo appearance in the post-credits scene of 2012's Professor Layton vs. Phoenix Wright: Ace Attorney.

In September 2024, Edgeworth's outfit and hairstyle were added to Among Us as a free cosmetic item. The update corresponded with the release of Ace Attorney Investigations Collection.

In May 2025, Edgeworth made a brief cameo in a Minnie the Minx comic published in The Beano, cross-examining a cat (who only responds "Meow.") as to its whereabouts.

== Concept and creation ==
According to game designer Shu Takumi, Edgeworth was difficult to develop as a character compared to protagonist Phoenix Wright. Edgeworth's character came together once Takumi decided he would be rich. In the original game, Takumi designed Edgeworth to be an unlikable and tragic character. This is seen in Manfred von Karma raising Edgeworth to be a prosecutor and then prosecuting him for murder, just to have his revenge against Edgeworth's father.

In Edgeworth's original design, he was going to be a 36-year-old veteran prosecutor, but the staff decided that was not interesting enough as a rival. When Shu Takumi saw the second version of the character, he decided to create the backstory between him and Wright. The design team gave him a cravat to make a distinct silhouette but did not finalize that addition until finalizing von Karma's design. He worked with yaoi character designer Kumiko Suekane to make the relationship between Phoenix and Edgeworth more interesting, with Suekane being responsible for helping develop certain personality traits of both characters. Tatsurō Iwamoto designed early versions of the elder Miles and a mentor man, and was quite sad when they went away. He wanted to re-use them somewhere in the game, so he reworked that old Miles a bit and he became Manfred von Karma from the first game. The same design was used for the judge. Atsushi Inaba was shocked over seeing them.

Due to feeling it would be sad if Edgeworth kept losing each trial to Phoenix, and due in part to his popularity, Takumi chose instead to have a new opponent for Phoenix in Justice for All. He devised the character of Franziska von Karma as a result and rewrote most of the game's dialogue. When Takumi saw a comic depicting Edgeworth liking the Steel Samurai, he decided that a more likable Edgeworth would be "cuter", and so Edgeworth was fleshed out into the valuable friend and ally seen since "Farewell, My Turnabout". Edgeworth's final scene from the second game was one of Inaba's final parts.

For the third game, Takumi noted that Edgeworth had become a popular character, even more than Phoenix, which led to ideas on how to use him. Takumi was against Edgeworth being depicted as a supposedly brilliant prosecutor who still manages to lose every case against Phoenix. This led to alterations from the first trilogy with Edgeworth appearing in the end of the second game to support Phoenix and ultimately becoming playable in the third. Takumi was already writing the story for the final case of the third game when he had the idea of making Edgeworth playable, but said it was such a 'lightbulb' moment for him that he immediately started rewriting his drafts. This led to the scene where Phoenix goes to the hospital in the final case. Takumi enjoyed writing Edgeworth in the third game, finding it refreshing as the character had different ideas from Phoenix. He also liked exploring his relationship with Detective Gumshoe, which made him love Gumshoe even more.

The older Edgeworth in Dual Destinies went through many iterations. In the first design, he had large frills that went down to his thighs. In other designs, he had grown facial hair. In the end, Edgeworth retained an "elegant" look, with rolled-back sleeves and vest, and sporting a longer coat and a pair of glasses, appearing more like his father.

== Reception ==
Miles Edgeworth has been well-received by critics. In 2009, GamesRadar+ named him among the best new video game characters of the decade, seeing him as a more complex figure than the series' main protagonist, Phoenix, and suggesting that "in a perfect world," Edgeworth would take the leading role. Similarly, Adventure Gamers hailed him as the best character of 2010 and "one of the most intriguing" in the adventure genre, noting how Edgeworth's presence often eclipsed Phoenix's and appreciating the development of their relationship, as well as Edgeworth's expansion into his own spinoff series. Malindy Hetfeld of PC Gamer praised Edgeworth's character arc, highlighting the message that "before you can show justice to other people, you have to experience justice yourself", and appreciated how even game characters may take time to find themselves.

In a 2024 Capcom survey, Edgeworth was voted the most popular character of the Apollo Justice trilogy, ahead of Phoenix and Apollo. Touch Arcade lauded Edgeworth's "collected personality", a refreshing counterpoint to the franchise's often hapless protagonists, in Ace Attorney Investigations: Miles Edgeworth. For its sequel, The Daily Trojan praised its morally gray setting for challenging Edgeworth's development. Anime News Network highlighted his expanded backstory in the seventh episode of the Ace Attorney anime series, furthering his character's appeal.

The dynamic between Edgeworth and Phoenix Wright has become one of the most popular character ships in video games, spawning from a particular exchange where Edgeworth describes Phoenix's presence as bringing back "unnecessary feelings... unease and uncertainty" with a focus on the first half of the phrase. Hayes Madsen of Inverse ran through elements within the series' canon that members of the fandom see as hinting at romantic undertones, noted the characters' dedication to understanding each other and a set of matching rings of the characters released as merchandise, and praised how the connection made in fanworks shipping the characters subverts typical video game "machismo". Senior narrative designer of Claire Stenger, a senior narrative designer at Gameloft, noted that the series' creator, Shu Takumi, took influence from yaoi artist Kumiko Suekane to make the relationship layered; Takumi called their bond in Justice for All a "rekindling", allegorical of a romance while non-romantic in nature, and viewed their relationship as a strong, platonic bond. TechRadar noted that Edgeworth and Phoenix's rivalry had inspired the LGBTQ+ community to create games reflecting similar dynamics. The San Francisco Chronicle analysed a shot in Spirit of Justice where Phoenix's daughter Trucy Wright is shown resting on Edgeworth's shoulder, likening it to a father's "quiet sacrifice for his child's rest", speculating on the potential for future Ace Attorney media to explore Edgeworth in a queer-platonic or romantic same-sex relationship.
