= Ace Attorney Investigations 2: Prosecutor's Gambit =

2011 video game

- International cover art featuring the game's main characters, as seen in Ace Attorney Investigations Collection
- Developer: Capcom
- Publisher: Capcom
- Director: Takeshi Yamazaki
- Producer: Motohide Eshiro
- Designers: Takanori Amano; Natsuki Ikawa
- Artist: Tatsuro Iwamoto
- Writers: Takeshi Yamazaki; Yuki Nakamura; Teruhiro Shimogawa
- Composer: Noriyuki Iwadare
- Series: Ace Attorney
- Platforms: Nintendo DS; Android; iOS
- Release: Nintendo DS: JP: February 3, 2011; Android, iOS: JP: December 21, 2017
- Genre: Adventure
- Mode: Single-player

Ace Attorney Investigations 2: Prosecutor's Gambit (Note: Gyakuten Kenji 2 (Japanese: 逆転検事2; "Turnabout Prosecutor 2")) is an adventure video game developed by Capcom. It was released in Japan for the Nintendo DS in 2011 and for Android and iOS in 2017. It is the sixth entry in the Ace Attorney series, and the sequel to Ace Attorney Investigations: Miles Edgeworth (2009).

The game follows prosecutor Miles Edgeworth, detective Dick Gumshoe and the teenage thief Kay Faraday, who investigate five cases; they face off against judge Verity Gavèlle, a rival character who is part of a "prosecutor purge" that removes weaker prosecutors from duty. The gameplay is divided into two types of phases: investigations, where the player searches the crime scene for evidence and talks to witnesses, and rebuttals, where they aim to find contradictions in witnesses' testimonies using the evidence found during the investigations.

The development team, which included director Takeshi Yamazaki, producer Motohide Eshiro and character designer Tatsuro Iwamoto, created the game for the series' tenth anniversary and finalized its direction during a five-day stay in the Capcom Manor in 2010. The game took shorter than usual to create, as the developers had the original Ace Attorney Investigations to use as a base, leading to an increased focus on the game's story. Reviewers were positive about the game, citing its story and the new "Mind Chess" gameplay mechanic as highlights. The game was not localized for several years, although a fan translation was released in 2014; video game publications have commented on the lack of an English release and included it on lists of games they wanted to see localized. In 2024, the game finally received a worldwide release as part of the Ace Attorney Investigations Collection.

== Gameplay ==
Interrogations are presented as timed games of "Mind Chess".

Prosecutor's Gambit is an adventure game in which players control prosecutor Miles Edgeworth, who investigates five cases; in one of the cases, the player also controls Edgeworth's father Gregory. The gameplay is mostly the same as in the previous game, Ace Attorney Investigations: Miles Edgeworth, and is divided into two types of phases: investigations and rebuttals.

During the investigations, the player controls Edgeworth directly; they search the crime scene for evidence, and talk to witnesses to learn new information. As the player investigates, observed information is saved as Edgeworth's thoughts; by combining these, the player can obtain further information that would otherwise remain hidden. At some points, the player can use a device called "Little Thief" to generate hologram reproductions of the crime scene using known information about it; the player can walk around in the recreations and point out inconsistencies with the evidence, and update the recreation accordingly. Sometimes the player is able to switch back and forth between recreations of the crime scene at two different times.

A new gameplay mechanic, "Mind Chess", is used during investigations when a character refuses to testify. The player interrogates them, which is visualized as a game of chess, with the player aiming to destroy the other character's chess pieces. To do this, they need to build up their advantage in the discussion by alternating between speaking and listening; when the player believes they have the advantage, they can choose to go on the offensive. The Mind Chess sections are timed, with the player having to make decisions before the timer bar has decreased all the way. The player takes damage if they make wrong choices, and the Mind Chess opponents get more difficult throughout the game.

After obtaining sufficient information and evidence from the investigation, the player confronts other characters and reads through their testimonies of the events in the case. The player can choose to press the character for more information on their statements, aiming to discover contradictions between the testimony and the evidence; if they find one, they can choose to present collected evidence from the investigations to point out the contradiction.

== Synopsis ==
=== Characters and setting ===
Prosecutor's Gambit takes place roughly one week after Ace Attorney Investigations, and features the same three main characters: prosecutor Miles Edgeworth; detective Dick Gumshoe; and teenage thief Kay Faraday. Other returning characters include prosecutor Franziska von Karma and her father Manfred, Interpol agent Shi-Long Lang, detective Tyrell Badd, forensics student Ema Skye, and Edgeworth's father Gregory Edgeworth, who is playable during an extended flashback sequence. Several characters from previous entries also make cameo appearances throughout the game.

Prosecutor's Gambit introduces a new judge, Verity Gavèlle, who serves as Edgeworth's rival; she is part of the "Committee for Prosecutorial Excellence", which follows the actions of potentially troublesome and corrupt prosecutors to justify removing them from duty. Other major new characters include Eddie Fender, a defense attorney as well as Gregory's former protégé, and Eustace Winner, a young prosecutor hailed as a prodigy.

=== Plot ===
An assassination attempt is made on Zheng Fa's president Di-Jun Wang; he survives, but his head bodyguard Bastian Rook is found dead. Asked by the Chief Prosecutor to investigate, Miles Edgeworth discovers that the assassination attempt was a setup staged by the president to reverse his declining popularity, and that Rook's second-in-command Bronco Knight killed Rook to replace him as head bodyguard. Knight is arrested, but is found dead in prison days later. Knight's friend Simeon Saint is suspected of the murder, but Edgeworth's attempt to investigate is stymied when judge Verity Gavèlle assigns rookie prosecutor Eustace Winner to the case in Edgeworth's place. To investigate, Edgeworth teams up with his father Gregory's former protégé Eddie Fender. They suspect several inmates, including the assassin Bodhidharma Kanis, but eventually discover that the prison's warden Fifi Laguarde killed Knight, believing that he worked for Kanis and had been sent to kill her. Saint is freed, but Gavèlle warns Edgeworth that he could lose his prosecutor's badge if he keeps investigating cases he is not assigned to.

Shortly afterwards, chef Carmelo Gusto is almost killed in an art gallery run by Judy Bound. Eustace is assigned to prosecute under Gavèlle's direction, but Edgeworth still investigates. Edgeworth learns that 18 years prior, Gregory and Fender were hired to defend Bound's partner Samson Tangaroa from the charge of murdering fellow chef Artie Frost during a cooking competition. Because the body had disappeared, Gregory and prosecutor Manfred von Karma could not make much progress, but von Karma coerced Tangaroa into falsely confessing to being an accomplice. This led to Gregory accusing von Karma of forging evidence, resulting in Gregory's murder in the infamous DL-6 Incident. (Note: As depicted in the 2001 video game Phoenix Wright: Ace Attorney.) Edgeworth concludes that Bound attempted to kill Gusto as a trap to reveal Frost's killer; Bound confesses but accuses Gusto. Mistakenly believing that the statute of limitations for the crime has expired, Gusto admits to murdering Frost, whom he had conspired with to cheat in the competition before Frost betrayed him. Gusto and Bound are jailed, and Tangaroa is freed after 18 years. Edgeworth also learns that Gusto and Frost had sons who disappeared on the day of Frost's murder.

Days later, an injured and amnesic Kay is accused of murdering defense attorney Rosie Ringer. Gavèlle warns Edgeworth that the Committee for Prosecutorial Excellence will take his badge if he becomes involved with Kay's case; Edgeworth voluntarily gives up his badge and investigates with Fender and Ema. He discovers that someone has been auctioning off evidence from criminal cases and finds a recording indicating that Ringer's murderer had a burn mark. During Edgeworth's committee hearing, Gavèlle reveals that Excelsius Winner, the head of the committee and Eustace's father, is the auctioneer and the one responsible for legal corruption in his former position as chief prosecutor, which Gavèlle and Ringer had been investigating. Edgeworth exposes a burn mark on Excelsius's chin, identifying him as Ringer's murderer, and Kay recovers her memories.

President Di-Jun Wang is found dead later that morning; meanwhile, Excelsius attempts to manipulate Laguarde's trial through blackmailing Gavèlle by having her adopted son, Shaun Fenn, kidnapped. Edgeworth and Eustace prevent this and Edgeworth investigates the president's murder, learning that Wang has been dead for 12 years and the person thought to be the president was a body double; the body double had hired Kanis to kill the president to take his place, with Laguarde and Excelsius aiding as his accomplices.

Saint is revealed to be Gusto's son; he was abducted by Knight on his father Frost's orders on the day of the cooking competition. Kanis saved the boys from freezing and brought them to an orphanage operated by Laguarde. Saint later witnessed Kanis kill Wang; when Kanis was about to be betrayed by the body double, Laguarde and Excelsius, Saint helped Kanis escape. As a result, Saint was forced to go into hiding from the three conspirators. Saint later enacted his revenge on both the conspirators and Knight by killing the body double and manipulating Laguarde and Excelsius into killing Knight and Ringer respectively; he also framed Kay for Ringer's murder to ensure that Edgeworth would investigate and expose Excelsius. Saint is imprisoned and Edgeworth regains his prosecutor's badge.

== Development and release ==
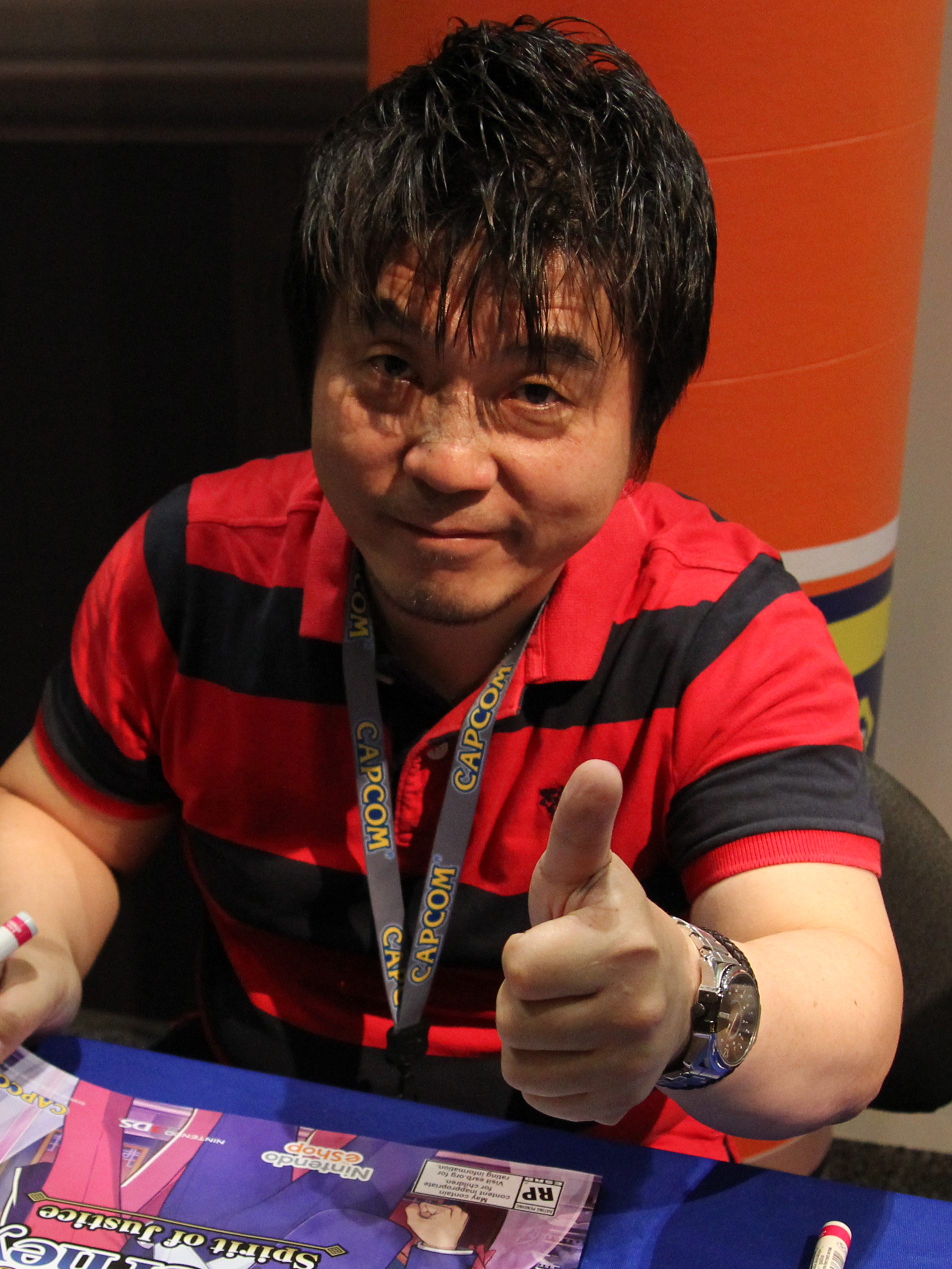
The game was produced by Motohide Eshiro.

Prosecutor's Gambit was produced by Motohide Eshiro and directed by Takeshi Yamazaki, and features character designs by Tatsuro Iwamoto and music by Noriyuki Iwadare. Takuro Fuse, who would later become the character designer and art director for Ace Attorney, was in charge of the game's event images, and the opening and ending sequences to the episodes. While the original Ace Attorney Investigations had taken longer than usual for an Ace Attorney game to develop due to its several new gameplay systems that had to be created from scratch, Prosecutor's Gambit went faster due to it already having a base game to build upon, resulting in the developers being able to put more focus on the game's story. According to Eshiro and Yamazaki, one of the major changes compared to the first Ace Attorney Investigations was the addition of an interrogation game mechanic; they chose to present it metaphorically as a game of chess, which was Edgeworth's favorite game. Another such change was the graphical improvements to the game's sprites and background art.

In the summer of 2010, the development team spent five days and four nights in a place called the Capcom Manor to work on the game; this was inspired by the filmmaker Akira Kurosawa, who would gather scriptwriters in a hotel room to create the scripts for his films. During their stay in the manor, they discussed the game's plot and the new gameplay system, finalized the direction, and created rough sketches for most characters in the game. For the new character Verity Gavèlle, Iwamoto used a female saint as the main image for her design, and imagined her as being an older woman he could look up to. Another new character, Eustace Winner, was Eshiro's favorite minor character in the series because of his character arc and how he grows throughout the game. The game was developed for the Ace Attorney series' tenth anniversary; because of this, several characters from previous games in the series made cameo appearances, including Frank Sahwit and Will Powers.

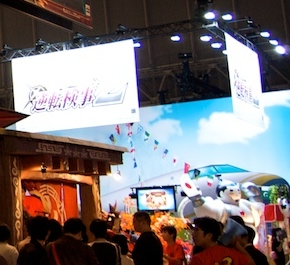
The game was showcased at Tokyo Game Show 2010; the display booth is made to resemble the location of the game's first case.

The game was first revealed in Famitsu in September 2010 and was showcased at the 2010 Tokyo Game Show. A Flash-based demo was released on the game's official website in 2010, and a Nintendo DS demo was distributed in 2011 through the Wii console, Nintendo Zone hotspots, and "DS Station" kiosks at retailers. The game was released by Capcom in Japan for the Nintendo DS on February 3, 2011, and for Android and iOS on December 21, 2017. The Nintendo DS version was released in several different editions: a standard edition, which only includes the game; a "collector's pack", which includes a copy of the game, an orchestral soundtrack CD by Iwadare, a DVD with footage from the game's appearance at Tokyo Game Show, and a booklet with a manga by Iwamoto; an "extended edition", which includes a copy of the game and a Miles Edgeworth figurine; and a "limited edition", which includes all the items from the other editions.

=== Localization ===
In early 2011, Christian Svensson at Capcom said that there were no plans at the time to release Ace Attorney Investigations 2 in regions outside Japan, due to higher localization costs than estimated returns; according to Eshiro, however, the main reason for the lack of a localization was scheduling, as all the staff working on the game had disbanded and moved to different teams after finishing the game, and were unable to work on a localization. Svensson said that there was a possibility of a release on another platform, and that he would discuss ways for it to happen with Capcom's strategy and R&D teams. In December 2011, Capcom was still discussing internally how to address the Ace Attorney audience, with Svensson saying that there is potential to release Ace Attorney Investigations 2 as a downloadable digital title. The game's potential English release was still discussed internally at Capcom in March 2012, but in January 2013, Svensson said that while Ace Attorney Investigations 2 still was talked about at Capcom, all their Ace Attorney resources, especially ones related to localization, were focused on the then-upcoming Phoenix Wright: Ace Attorney – Dual Destinies. In a February 2024 interview discussing the localization of Apollo Justice: Ace Attorney Trilogy, Capcom localization director Janet Hsu mentioned wanting to see a translation of Ace Attorney Investigations 2 happen.

An English fan translation of Ace Attorney Investigations 2, subtitled Prosecutor's Path, was developed, and includes localized names for new characters in the style of Capcom's Ace Attorney localizations. The translation project was done on the Ace Attorney fan site Court-Records, where a user asked people who were interested in the project to send in applications, which had to be approved for them to become part of the project. Alexa Ray Corriea at Polygon described this approach as uncommon, with most fan translation projects letting anyone help if they want, but said that it made the project more professional. A patch translating the game's first two episodes was released in 2013, and a complete patch for the game was released in 2014. A final patch was released in 2015. In 2023, the translation was ported to the Android version of the game.

In June 2024, it was announced during a Nintendo Direct that the game would be receiving its first official English release, subtitled Prosecutor's Gambit, as part of the Ace Attorney Investigations Collection, an HD remaster of both Investigations games. The compilation was released on September 6, 2024. Localization director Janet Hsu noted that the bulk of their work for the collection was focused on Prosecutor's Gambit, with Miles Edgeworth receiving only the most essential updates. They also noted that they had not played the fan translation, as they did not want it to influence their own localization choices. Hsu stated that having worked on the series for nearly 20 years allowed them the knowledge needed to maintain consistency with the other games' localizations, particularly in regard to callbacks to earlier entries. They also noted the difference in platform afforded them a larger textbox in Investigations Collection compared to that of the Nintendo DS releases, though they attempted to keep lines of dialogue relatively brief to retain the spirit of the original localizations. In addition to the list of voice actors for the English dub, Capcom hired Swedish transgender singer, drag queen and actress Endigo to do the voice work for Eustace Winner.

== Reception ==
Reception

Review scores
Publication	Score
Famitsu	8/10, 8/10, 8/10, 8/10
Jeuxvideo.com	19/20

On its initial release week, Prosecutor's Gambit was the top-selling game in Japan across all platforms, selling more than 132,000 units. This was lower than the first Ace Attorney Investigations, which sold 172,000 copies during its opening week. The Japanese sales tracker Media Create theorized that this was due to Prosecutor's Gambit having less TV commercials than the first game, and a lower level of consumer recognition according to weekly recognition surveys. They also noted that marketing had been targeting women more than men, leading to an increased interest among women, but decreased interest both among men and overall. During the game's second week, it dropped to fourth place in the Japanese game sales charts, selling an additional 30,910 copies.

Reviewers at Famitsu liked the game's story, saying that the "turnabouts" that come from tense situations are exciting. They also liked the sense of urgency brought about with the Mind Chess, and called the game's use of sound effects excellent. AsbelGrants at Jeuxvideo.com called Prosecutor's Gambit the best entry in the series, saying that the plot and characters were the game's highlights, keeping the player in suspense until the end. They found the first episode surprisingly strong, as it was a "long and exciting case" compared to other Ace Attorney games' tutorial-like first episodes. They noted how the gameplay was mostly the same as in Ace Attorney Investigations, but did not consider this a problem as they thought it had the best type of investigations in the series, and they enjoyed the implementation of the Mind Chess feature. They enjoyed the music, calling it memorable.

In 2011, Game Informer ranked the game as 8th on a list of the best video games that had not been released in North America; in 2015, they included it on a list of twelve video games they wanted to see localized, saying that it could possibly be released via the Nintendo eShop. In 2012, GamesRadar ranked it as 7th on a list of the top seven games that "absolutely need to be localized for the west". Rebecca Rudeen at NF Magazine called the lack of a localization unfortunate, saying that the game was a crucial part of Edgeworth's story. Tim Sheehy at Destructoid called the game promising, based on a demo available at Tokyo Game Show, saying that the demo left him wanting more. He wished that the voice acting from the game's trailer had been present within the game itself, but also said that the lack of voice acting would not keep him from wanting to play the game.
