= Ace Attorney Investigations Collection =

2024 compilation video game

- Cover art featuring the game's main characters
- Developer: Capcom
- Publisher: Capcom
- Director: Satoru Sakai (Note: Original games directed by Takeshi Yamazaki)
- Producers: Kenichi Hashimoto; Shunsuke Nishida
- Composers: Noriyuki Iwadare; Yasuko Yamada
- Series: Ace Attorney
- Engine: Unity
- Platforms: Nintendo Switch; PlayStation 4; Windows; Xbox One
- Release: WW: September 6, 2024
- Genres: Adventure, visual novel
- Mode: Single-player

Ace Attorney Investigations Collection is a 2024 compilation video game of both games in the Ace Attorney spin-off series Ace Attorney Investigations, consisting of Ace Attorney Investigations: Miles Edgeworth (2009) and Ace Attorney Investigations 2: Prosecutor's Gambit (2011). It marks the first time that Prosecutor's Gambit was released outside of Japan.

== Development and release ==
Ace Attorney Investigations Collection was announced in June 2024 during a Nintendo Direct. According to producer Shunsuke Nishida, the collection was conceived as a way to release both games of the spin-off series on modern consoles and to localize the previously Japan-exclusive Ace Attorney Investigations 2: Prosecutor's Gambit. The collection features newly drawn character animations, with the ability to change between the original and new sprites. It also includes a gallery where the player can view character illustrations, animations, design sketches, promotional art, and accolades, as well as listen to the music from both games. Additional re-arranged music tracks for the gallery were offered as a pre-order incentive. The collection was released on September 6, 2024 for Nintendo Switch, PlayStation 4, Windows and Xbox One.

== Reception ==
Reception

Aggregate scores
Aggregator	Score
Metacritic	(NS) 85/100 (PC) 82/100 (PS4) 83/100 (XONE) 80/100
OpenCritic	89% recommend

Review scores
Publication	Score
Computer Games Magazine	9/10
Eurogamer	3/5
Hardcore Gamer	4.5/5
Nintendo Life	8/10
Nintendo World Report	8/10
Push Square	7/10
RPGFan	85%

The game received "generally favorable reviews" according to review aggregator Metacritic. On OpenCritic, the game was recommended by 89% of critics.
