= N-acetylgalactosamine kinase =

Identifiers
- EC no.: 2.7.1.157

Databases
- BRENDA: enzyme data
- ExPASy: NiceZyme view
- KEGG: enzyme entry
- MetaCyc: metabolic pathway
- Rhea: reactions
- PDB structures: RCSB PDB PDBe PDBsum
Search
- PMC: articles
- PubMed: articles
- NCBI: proteins

N-acetylgalactosamine kinase (EC 2.7.1.157) is an enzyme that catalyzes the chemical reaction

ATP +
N-acetylgalactosamine
ADP +
N-acetyl-α-D-galactosamine 1-phosphate

The enzyme characterised from kidney converts N-acetylgalactosamine to N-acetyl-α-D-galactosamine 1-phosphate by transferring a phosphate group from the cofactor, adenosine triphosphate (ATP), which is converted to adenosine diphosphate (ADP).

This enzyme is a transferase, specifically one transferring phosphorus-containing groups (phosphotransferases) with an alcohol group as acceptor. The systematic name of this enzyme class is ATP:N-acetyl-D-galactosamine 1-phosphotransferase. Other names in common use include GK2, GalNAc kinase, and N-acetylgalactosamine (GalNAc)-1-phosphate kinase.
