= Bobby Hoff =

American poker player (1939–2013)

- Nickname: The Wizard
- Born: Robert Charles Hoff; December 14, 1939; Victoria, Texas, U.S.
- Died: August 25, 2013 (aged 73)

World Series of Poker
- Bracelet: None
- Money finishes: 13
- Highest WSOP Main Event finish: 2nd, 1979

World Poker Tour
- Title: None
- Final table: None
- Money finish: 1

Bobby "The Wizard" Hoff (December 14, 1939 – August 25, 2013) was an American professional poker player, based in Long Beach, California. According to Hoff, his nickname "The Wizard" refers to his ability to make mountains of chips disappear.

== Early years ==
Hoff was born in 1939 in Victoria, Texas.

In 1958, Hoff studied at the University of Texas on an athletics scholarship, where he frequently played golf from a scratch handicap.

Hoff learned poker in Las Vegas three years after graduating. He worked as a poker dealer and played regularly during his off time. He took up blackjack after reading the book Beat the Dealer by Edward O. Thorp and became a skilled player; however, he often got drunk and lost his winnings. He joined a blackjack team and played regularly for five years. Eventually he was banned from the majority of blackjack tables in Las Vegas, forcing him to return to poker. Hoff became friends with Sailor Roberts, who staked much of his poker action.

== World Series of Poker ==
In the 1979 World Series of Poker (WSOP) $10,000 no limit hold'em main event, Hoff came back from a chip count of $1,730 early on the first day to $225,700 early in the final table's action. He eliminated Johnny Moss in 5th place when his A♦ 10♠ outdrew A♥ Q♠ when the 10♥ came on the river. Hoff reached the heads-up stage of the tournament, facing amateur Hal Fowler, whom he had eliminated from the same event in 1978. In the final hand, Hoff's A♥ A♣ were outdrawn by Fowler's 7♠ 6♦ on a board of J♠ 5♥ 3♣ 4♠ 10♦.

The heads-up match lasted over 10 hours, and was considered the original David and Goliath match of the WSOP, as Hoff was the favorite to win. This led to increased attendance in future WSOP main events, as people realized that anyone could win.

Hoff went on to have nightmares about the heads-up match for several weeks afterwards. During this time, Hoff accused Fowler of consuming either Valium or Methaqualone throughout the heads-up match. Hoff's cocaine habit grew, as he began to inject it rather than snort it.

The 2006 WSOP main event winner Jamie Gold described Hoff as "maybe the best player in the world."

== Later poker career ==
Hoff finished in the money of the $10,000 WSOP main event three times in his career, 1990 (13th of 194), 1993 (25th of 231), and 1998 (12th of 350).

He also appeared in Poker Superstars II, finishing second in two heats (both times to Ted Forrest).

He had numerous other final table finishes and cashes at live tournaments, where his total winnings exceeded $530,000.

His alias on UltimateBet was "DaWiz".

Hoff described Bobby Baldwin as the best poker player he ever saw.

== Illness and death ==
In December 2010, Hoff suffered a stroke which led to his hospitalization in Houston, Texas, in a stable condition. He recovered and returned to play in California.

Hoff died on August 25, 2013, at the age of 73.
