= Apollo Justice =

Ace Attorney protagonist

- Ace Attorney character
- Apollo Justice in Apollo Justice: Ace Attorney Trilogy
- First game: Apollo Justice: Ace Attorney (2007)
- Created by: Shu Takumi
- Designed by: Kazuya Nuri
- Voiced by: English: JP Kellams (Apollo Justice); Orion Acaba (Dual Destinies, Spirit of Justice); Japanese: Kōjirō Ogiwara (Apollo Justice); KENN (Dual Destinies, Spirit of Justice)

In-universe information
- Occupation: Defense attorney
- Family: Jove Justice (father); Thalassa Gramarye (mother); Trucy Wright (half-sister); Zak Gramarye (step-father); Magnifi Gramarye (grandfather); Dhurke Sahdmadhi (foster father); Nahyuta Sahdmadhi (foster brother)

Apollo Justice, known in Japanese as Hōsuke Odoroki (Japanese: 王泥喜 法介, Hepburn: Odoroki Hōsuke) is the protagonist of the 2007 video game Apollo Justice: Ace Attorney. He was created by Shu Takumi as a new protagonist, meant to be "aggressive, passionate, and youthful" in contrast to fellow defense attorney Phoenix Wright, the protagonist of the Phoenix Wright: Ace Attorney Trilogy, whose events takes place seven years before the story of Apollo Justice. Apollo's first case, under mentor Kristoph Gavin, is to defend Phoenix against accusations of murder. Apollo has the power to detect tells using a special bracelet and in Apollo Justice, faces off against prosecutor Klavier Gavin. He subsequently appears in Phoenix Wright: Ace Attorney – Dual Destinies and Phoenix Wright: Ace Attorney – Spirit of Justice as one of three playable protagonists, alongside Phoenix Wright and Athena Cykes. Apollo was designed by Kazuya Nuri. His design in Dual Destinies was meant to make players question what happened to him between Apollo Justice and this. His English name comes from the god Apollo and his belief in justice.

Apollo received generally mixed reception. Critics felt that Apollo was overshadowed by Phoenix in his own game, which prevented him from having time to develop his own character. A writer from Waypoint attributed Phoenix's return as a playable character in Dual Destinies to fan response. Apollo's role in the subsequent entries was met with more positive reception: some critics felt that he was given more time to shine, others that he should have had more time to develop.

== Appearances ==
Apollo first appears in Apollo Justice: Ace Attorney as the protagonist and defense attorney to former series protagonist, Phoenix Wright, who was no longer a defense attorney after an incident seven years ago. He is mentored by Kristoph Gavin, an associate of Phoenix's. During a cross-examination, Apollo discovers an ability to focus on tells in significant detail, allowing him to use them to get more information from witnesses. Eventually, Phoenix presents evidence of Kristoph being the true killer, leading to Kristoph's confession, though Apollo learns this evidence was forged, making Apollo angry. Apollo eventually accepts work under Phoenix, where he meets Trucy Wright, Phoenix's daughter. While defending another client, he meets Kristoph's brother, Klavier Gavin, a prosecutor and musician, and Apollo's opponent for all subsequent trials in Apollo Justice. Trucy teaches Apollo that his power of perception comes from his bracelet, and he ultimately proves his client not guilty. He and Trucy defend another client, the pianist for singer Lamiroir, before defending someone for murder as part of a test of the jurist system. It is discovered that this case is connected to the case where Phoenix lost his badge, and Apollo successfully gets Kristoph convicted of the murder after the jury finds Kristoph guilty. Unbeknownst to Apollo, he and Trucy are half-siblings, with their mother being Thalassa Gramarye, who used the "Lamiroir" name as a cover.

Apollo reappears as one of three playable characters in Phoenix Wright: Ace Attorney – Dual Destinies, alongside Phoenix Wright and Athena Cykes. He defends multiple people in court, ultimately defending someone accused of murdering his childhood friend, Clay Terran. He becomes suspicious of Athena due to his bracelet reacting to Athena's denial of not having seen the murder weapon before. This caused Apollo to wear a bandage over one of his eyes to prevent himself from being able to see any of Cyke's tells. During his defense, a bomb was found in the courtroom, exploding and injuring Apollo. He took a leave of absence after the case involving the bombing, with Phoenix proving his client's innocence using evidence that ended up implicating Athena. Apollo accused Athena of the murder, prompting Phoenix to prove him wrong, which he ultimately does. Together, they prove who the true killer is.

The three protagonists reappear in Phoenix Wright: Ace Attorney – Spirit of Justice, where he defends Trucy for murder, once again working with Ema, who had become a forensic technician. He faced off against prosecutor Nahyuta Sahdmadhi, whom Apollo hadn't seen for 15 years. After proving Trucy's innocence, he confronted Nahyuta, saying that he had changed since they last met. During the third episode, Phoenix learns that Apollo and Nahyuta were foster brothers, and their father was Dhurke Sahdmadhi. Apollo was later visited by his foster father, who he assisted in finding an item called the Founder's Orb. After securing it, Apollo visited the Kingdom of Khura'in, his childhood home, and was forced to defend Dhurke for murder. During the trial, Apollo discovered that Dhurke was actually dead, with his spirit being channeled by Queen Amara, who was thought dead. He is able to prove both the murder was done by the current queen, Ga'ran Sigatar Khura'in, as well as proving she was the one to kill his birth father when he was young.

== Concept and creation ==
Apollo Justice was created by Shu Takumi, creator of the Ace Attorney series. After the completion of the Phoenix Wright: Ace Attorney Trilogy, he believed that Phoenix's story was complete, ending the series. Years later, with a fourth announcement planned, Takumi decided to create a new protagonist and did not plan to include Phoenix. This changed when staff suggested Phoenix be included in some form, leading him to make Phoenix the defendant in the first trial. Takumi had difficulties writing Apollo, feeling like he had used everything in his head when writing Phoenix Wright already. He ultimately made a character whose traits were the opposite of Phoenix's, making him "aggressive, passionate, and youthful."

He was designed by Kazuya Nuri, and was the first protagonist Nuri had designed. His goal was to create a character who can be both cool and easy to get attached to with his expressions. He borrowed elements from Phoenix's face and incorporated them in Apollo's. His bracelet was originally a wristwatch, added due to his arms feeling empty due to his rolled up sleeves. Due to the intricacies of the wristwatch's design, people believed the item was significant, leading Takumi to create the perception mechanic. The accessory was originally conceived as an eye-shaped wristwatch before it became a bracelet. When designing Apollo and his role in Dual Destinies, they wanted to make players ask what happened to Apollo between Apollo Justice and this game. His stoic attitude, jacket, and eye cover were made early on in the game's design, though the reason for these features went through significant changes across the game's development. The jacket was originally intended to tie into Apollo's birth father, with another concept being that it belonged to an organization Apollo joined. Another concept for Apollo's story in this game was to have him seduced by a female prosecutor to the dark side of the law, a concept repurposed for another character interaction with Apollo, though the seduction was significantly more subdued.

When localizing Apollo Justice, localizer Janet Hsu stated that the name Apollo was chosen due in part to Phoenix being named after the legendary bird of the same name. Hsu named him after the god Apollo, feeling that the god's connection to the sun and truth fit Apollo's personality. The name "Justice" was chosen to reflect his pursuit of justice as opposed to Phoenix Wright's aspiration to defend his clients' rights. His surname was decided on by a collaboration between the Japanese and American divisions.

== Reception ==
Apollo has received generally mixed reception, particularly for his role in his debut game. Adventure Gamers writer Kim Wild found difficulty investing herself in Apollo as a character, feeling he lacks the same impact as Phoenix in his trilogy of games. She felt that he never got a chance to shine due to being in Phoenix's shadow, believing he had room to grow but that his introduction was a shallow one. GamesRadar+ writer Carolyn Gudmundson felt similarly lukewarm about Apollo in his debut game, noting that while she may be biased due to Phoenix "[setting the bar] impossibly high" for him, she felt he lacked charm and depth. She felt that Klavier was both deeper and more likable. Waypoint writer Steven Wright felt that the backlash to Apollo being the protagonist prompted Phoenix to return as a protagonist in Dual Destinies.

Reception for Apollo in subsequent entries was more positive. Official Nintendo Magazine writer Olivia Cottrell expressed excitement to see Apollo return in Dual Destinies, stating that she never felt he got a fair shot with only one game under his belt before then, compared to Phoenix's three and Edgeworth's two. She felt that he had not been given the chance to shine, and thus was not as popular in the Ace Attorney fandom. She hoped that his appearance in Dual Destinies would help him become more popular, hoping that he isn't made to be a side character in this game. Rock Paper Shotgun writer Katharine Castle felt that Apollo spent the Apollo Justice Trilogy in Phoenix's shadow, arguing that his character suffered from Capcom not knowing what to do with his character. Paste writer Stephen Swift was critical of Apollo's handling in Apollo Justice, believing that he and Trucy Wright lacked chemistry despite spending so much time together. He felt that the duo was a case of the blind leading the blind, as Apollo was new and Trucy was "unconcerned." He also felt that, because the story was so centered around Phoenix, Apollo wound up upstaged by him, preventing Apollo from developing or establishing himself as a character. Commenting on his appearance in Dual Destinies, Swift felt that Apollo is given the chance to have some development, believing that it allows Apollo to mature where his first title did not.

Famitsu writer Kawachi felt that he started off unreliable, but felt he became reliable and cool as he progressed in Dual Destinies and Spirit of Justice. GameSpot writer Diego Nicolás Argüello felt that these two games tend to ignore Apollo, as well as his backstory from his first title. He was critical of both entries for introducing new backstories involving an old friend and family in the country of Khura'in instead of expanding on the plot involving his family introduced in Apollo Justice. He argued that these new plots bore "little thematic relevance to his character, if any." Game Informer writer Elise Favis considered Apollo her favorite character in Spirit of Justice, appreciating the backstory he was given in it. She particularly felt that he evolved from being a rookie to coming into his own through the events of the game. VG247 writer Alex Donaldson compared the situation between Apollo and Phoenix to the one between Rey and Luke Skywalker from Star Wars, believing that both Phoenix and Luke were "impossible" to follow up with new protagonists. He felt that he did not manage to come into his own, believing by the end of the trilogy that he felt "short-changed." He believed that Takumi's involvement in Apollo Justice made the title feel more "confident," while the other two, which he was not involved with, returned to the status quo of Phoenix. Donaldson begrudged that he did not get more importance in these two games, though felt that he was a great character regardless.
