= Hal Fowler =

American poker player (1927–2000)

Harold Arthur Fowler
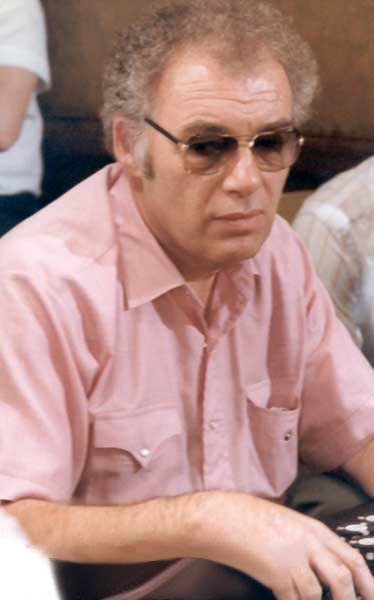
- Fowler at the 1979 World Series of Poker
- Nickname: Hal
- Born: January 12, 1927; Rutland, Vermont, U.S.
- Died: November 7, 2000 (aged 73)

World Series of Poker
- Bracelet: 1
- Money finish: 1
- Highest WSOP Main Event finish: Winner, 1979

Harold Arthur Fowler (January 12, 1927 – November 7, 2000) was an American poker player known for winning the 1979 World Series of Poker Main Event. He is considered the first amateur poker player to become poker's World Champion.

Fowler was born in Rutland, Vermont and later lived for many years in Tulare, California. Before his WSOP victory, he worked as an advertising executive.

== Poker ==
Although he was a relative unknown amateur player, Fowler won the 1979 World Series of Poker Main Event. At one point in the tournament, he was down to approximately 2,000 in chips (out of over 500,000 total tournament chips) at a final table that included Johnny Moss, Bobby Baldwin, Bobby Hoff, and other professional players. Additionally, it is believed that Fowler could not cover the entrance fee and Benny Binion had to loan it to him. Fowler's 1979 win is sometimes called the greatest upset in the history of the WSOP.

Fowler defeated Hoff heads up to win the championship when his 7♠ 6♦ made a gut-shot straight and defeated Hoff's A♣ A♥ on a board reading 5♥ 3♣ J♠ 4♠ 10♦.

Fowler later faded from the poker scene because of complications from diabetes that had an impact on his eyesight and his legs.

Fowler's career tournament earnings exceeded $380,000.

Fowler died at the age of 73 of hemorrhagic shock due to upper gastro-intestinal bleeding, after having been driven to a hospital by a friend on November 7, 2000. He had been living in a seniors' housing complex and was experiencing symptoms of a duodenal ulcer and cirrhosis.

=== World Series of Poker bracelet ===
Year	Tournament	Prize money (US$)
1979	$10,000 No Limit Hold'em World Championship	$270,000
