= Tilt (poker) =

Poker term describing frustration leading to worse plays

Tilt is a poker term for a state of mental or emotional confusion or frustration in which a player adopts a suboptimal strategy, usually resulting in the player becoming overly aggressive. Tilting is closely associated with another poker term, "steam".

Placing an opponent on tilt or dealing with being on tilt oneself is an important aspect of poker. It is a relatively frequent occurrence due to frustration, animosity against other players, or simply bad luck.

The term originated from pinball where physically tilting the machine causes some games to flash the word "TILT" and freeze the flippers.

Tilt is also common in other games, especially chess and esports. Tilting in esports causes players to "lose control due to anger". The most extreme reaction is termed a "ragequit", angrily leaving the match or quitting the game, physically turning off the device or breaking a part like a monitor or control device by smashing it.

== Common causes of tilt ==
The most common cause of tilt is losing, especially being defeated in a particularly public and humiliating fashion. In poker, a bad beat can upset the mental equilibrium essential for optimal poker judgment, causing frustration. Another common cause of tilt is bad manners from other players causing frustration which eventually leads to tilting.

Though not as commonly acknowledged or discussed, it is also quite possible to go on "winner's tilt" as a result of a positive trigger: such as winning unexpectedly, or going on a string of good luck. Strong positive emotions can be just as dizzying and detrimental to one's play as negative ones. Tilting and winner's tilt can both lead to the same habits.

== Advice when tilted ==
For the beginning player, the elimination or minimization of tilt is considered an essential improvement that can be made in play (for instance in the strategic advice of Mike Caro). Many advanced players (after logging thousands of table-hours) claim to have outgrown "tilt" and frustration, although other poker professionals admit it is still a "leak" in their game.

One commonly suggested way to fight tilt is to disregard the outcomes of pots, particularly those that are statistically uncommon. So-called "bad beats," when one puts a lot of chips in the pot with the best hand and still loses, deserve little thought; they are the product of variance, not bad strategy. This mindset calls for the player to understand poker is a game of decisions and correct play in making the right bets over a long period of time.

Another method for avoiding tilt is to try lowering one's variance, even if that means winning fewer chips overall. Therefore, one may play passively and fold marginal hands, even though that may mean folding the winning hand. This may also imply that one plays tightly— and looks for advantageous situations.

Once tilt begins, players are well-advised to leave the table and return when emotions have subsided. When away from the table, players are advised to take time to refresh themselves, eat and drink (non-alcoholic) if necessary, and take a break outside in the fresh air.

If none of these work in lessening tilt, players are advised to leave the game and not return to playing until they have shaken off the results that led to the tilt.

The intent of the advice is to prevent the upset person from letting negative emotions lead to bigger losses that can seriously hurt one's bankroll.

Tilt must be taken seriously, requiring immediate attention following its presence. The progression in poker for chronically tilted players may be significantly hindered as their judgement becomes progressively impaired as agitation becomes more prominent. Paying close attention to playing statistics can assist in preventing this, as a statistical overview of recent hands can reduce the player's likelihood to play impulsive hands habitually.

== Tilting others ==
The act of putting an opponent on tilt may not pay off in the short run, but if some time is put into practicing it, a player can quickly become an expert at "tilting" other players (with or without using bad manners). In theory, the long-run payoff of this tactic is a monetarily positive expectation.

Common methods of putting a table on tilt include:

1. Playing junk hands that have a lower chance of winning in the hope of either sucking out and delivering a bad beat (which can be an enjoyable occasional style which will make the table's play "looser") or bluffing the opponent off a better hand (with the option of showing the bluff for maximum tilting effect).
2. Victimising individuals at the table, (which is often considered a more old-fashioned tactic, identified with 1970s "verbal" experts such as Amarillo Slim.)
3. Pretending intoxication, i.e. hustling, excellently demonstrated by Paul Newman against Robert Shaw in The Sting (although his technique included cheating).
4. Constant chattering, making weird noises and motions whenever you win a hand, or other erratic behavior is a "tilting" or "loosening" approach first discussed by Mike Caro.
5. Taking an inordinate or otherwise inappropriate amount of time to announce and show your hand (also called "slow-rolling") at the showdown. (Such deliberate breaches of etiquette have the side effect of slowing play and risking barring, thereby limiting the earnings of the expert player. For this, and other social reasons, such tactics are mostly associated with novices.)

These antics can upset the other players at the table with the intention of getting them to play poorly.

== See also ==
- Cognitive bias
- Glossary of poker terms
- Tilting at windmills
