= Supersystem =

Supersystem or Super System may refer to:

- Supersystem (System concept), the top-level or 'container' of subsystems, the top-level of nested sub-hierarchies or sub-domains
- Supersystem (band), American band
- Supersystem (album), 1998 album by The Feelers
- Super/System, 1979 book by Doyle Brunson
- Super System 2, 2004 book by Doyle Brunson
- Super System 22, variant of Namco System 22, arcade system board
