= GS4 =

GS4 may refer to

- Samsung Galaxy S4, a 2013 smart phone
- Gyakuten Saiban 4, a 2007 video game
