= Super/System =

1978 poker book by Doyle Brunson

- First edition (publ. B & G Publishing Co.)
- Author: Doyle Brunson
- Publisher: B & G Publishing Co.
- Publication date: 1978

Super/System, one of the first books about poker strategy, was written and published in 1978 by Doyle Brunson, a professional poker player and multiple winner at the World Series of Poker.

== History and title ==
How I Made Over $1,000,000 Playing Poker was primarily written by Doyle Brunson who, at the time of publication in 1978, had won the main event of the World Series of Poker in 1976 and 1977. The book was one of the first comprehensive books on strategies for various poker games. Many notable poker players and tournament champions contributed sections to the book.

The title of the book was originally How I Made Over $1,000,000 Playing Poker. The second edition, published in 1979, bore the revised title, Super/ System. (Sometimes written as Super System, without a slash; Doyle Brunson's Super System; or Super/System: A Course in Power Poker.)

== Contents ==
The book begins with a biographical sketch of Doyle Brunson and then quickly discusses general poker strategy. The general strategy includes controlling emotion, watching competitors play, reasoning outplay, and other similar tips that benefit all forms of poker play.

The sections of the book dedicated to strategy were divided as follows:

- Draw poker written by Mike Caro. Among other things, Caro writes in detail about tells, how to gain information about an opponent's hand based on how they act. He is regarded as an expert on poker psychology and behavior and would later go on to write his own seminal book on tells.
- Seven-card stud written by Chip Reese
- Lowball written by Joey Hawthorne and Doyle Brunson
- Seven-card stud high-low split (with no qualifier for low) by David Sklansky
- Limit Texas hold 'em by Bobby Baldwin
- No-limit Texas hold 'em by Doyle Brunson

Finally, there is a comprehensive list of probability and statistics calculated by Mike Caro. In addition to raw numbers, many scenarios are investigated and common questions are answered.

== Influence ==
Many of today's top poker players, young and old, swear by Super/System. Although many years have passed since the original publication, it still contains relevant strategies and statistics. Brunson himself believes that because the book has been so influential, it probably cost him more money than he was paid for writing it.

Many of the poker variants are played differently today, and there are many new variants that are not covered in Super/System, so the book has been superseded in some areas.

== Super System 2 ==
A sequel titled Super System 2 was published in October 2004 (ISBN 1-58042-136-9).

The second book is broken up into several sections, each covering a different variant of poker, and written by experts on those games. Contributors include: Daniel Negreanu; Lyle Berman, founder of the World Poker Tour; Bobby Baldwin; Johnny Chan; Mike Caro; Jennifer Harman; Todd Brunson; Steve Zolotow; and Crandell Addington.

== Bibliography ==
- Brunson, Doyle; Reese, Chip & Hawthorne, Joey (2003) [First Published 1978]. Doyle Brunson's Super System: A Course in Power Poker. Bobby Baldwin, Mike Caro, David Sklansky (3 ed.). Cardoza Publishing. ISBN 978-1-58042-081-5.
