= Apollo Justice: Ace Attorney =

2007 video game

- English cover art featuring (from left to right) Apollo Justice, Klavier Gavin, Trucy Wright, and Kristoph Gavin
- Developer: Capcom
- Publisher: Capcom
- Director: Mitsuru Endo
- Producer: Minae Matsukawa
- Designers: Takeshi Yamazaki; Keisuke Yamakawa
- Programmers: Toshihiko Honda; Nobuhito Shimizu
- Artists: Kazuya Nuri; Akiko Nishizawa; Koujiro Ogiwara; Tatsuro Iwamoto
- Writer: Shu Takumi
- Composers: Toshihiko Horiyama; Hideki Okugawa
- Series: Ace Attorney
- Engine: RE Engine (Apollo Justice Trilogy)
- Platforms: Nintendo DS, iOS, Android, Nintendo 3DS
- Release: Nintendo DS: JP: April 12, 2007; NA: February 19, 2008; EU: May 9, 2008; AU: May 22, 2008; iOS: WW: December 1, 2016; Android: WW: December 8, 2016; Nintendo 3DS: NA: November 21, 2017; JP: November 22, 2017; EU: November 23, 2017
- Genres: Adventure, visual novel
- Mode: Single-player

Apollo Justice: Ace Attorney (Note: Known in Japan as Gyakuten Saiban 4 (Japanese: 逆転裁判4; lit. Turnabout Trial 4)) is a visual novel adventure video game developed and published by Capcom. It is the fourth title in the Ace Attorney series, and was released for the Nintendo DS handheld game console in Japan in 2007 and in the West in 2008, for iOS and Android in 2016, and for the Nintendo 3DS in 2017. It was also released for Nintendo Switch, PlayStation 4, Windows and Xbox One in 2024, as part of the Apollo Justice: Ace Attorney Trilogy compilation.

The game takes place seven years after the previous game, Phoenix Wright: Ace Attorney – Trials and Tribulations. Phoenix Wright, the main character of previous titles in the series, has been stripped of his attorney's badge, and Apollo Justice, an up-and-coming attorney, becomes his apprentice, working with Phoenix's adopted daughter Trucy on four cases. The player's goal is to get their clients declared not guilty; to do this, they investigate the cases and cross-examine witnesses. When finding inconsistencies in witness testimonies, the player is able to present pieces of evidence that contradict the witnesses' statements. They can also use the "perceive" system, in which they are able to see nervous motions or actions during witness testimonies, similar to a tell in poker.

The game was developed by a team of 28 staff members, including producer Minae Matsukawa, director Mitsuru Endo, and character designer Kazuya Nuri. Series creator Shu Takumi, who wrote the game's scenario and took on a supervisory role for the production, had wanted the series to end with Trials and Tribulations, as he felt that Phoenix's character had been explored fully; when it was decided that the game would get made, he wanted it to have a new main character with a new story, and wanted Phoenix to not make an appearance. Despite this, it was decided that Phoenix would serve as a mentor to Apollo. Apollo Justice sold around 250,000 copies during the first retail week and 515,417 by the end of 2007, and has been mostly positively received by critics.

== Gameplay ==
Apollo Justice introduces the "perceive" system, in which players look for nervous motions during witness testimonies.

Apollo Justice: Ace Attorney is, like the rest of the Ace Attorney series, a cross between the adventure game and visual novel genres. The player's goal is to defend their clients in four cases, and prove their innocence. The gameplay is separated into two types of situations: Investigations and trials.

During the investigation phase of each case, the player explores the game world by either using the stylus or the D-pad to select the actions they wish to engage in: Examine, Move, Talk, or Present. The player converses with non-player characters by selecting dialogue and can move around the game world by selecting the locations they wish to travel to. Information gained during Investigation Mode can be used during the Trial phase of the game and items picked up can be used as evidence. The player cannot progress without completing certain actions. Ema Skye, a character from the DS remake of the original Phoenix Wright: Ace Attorney game, often provides the player with opportunities to use DS features such as the microphone to perform actions such as dusting for fingerprints.

The trial portions consist of listening to and cross-examining witness testimonies. The player is given the option to either Press or Present evidence in response to statements made by witnesses. The player can either select their choice or yell into the microphone. By choosing Press, the player questions the witness's statement, which sometimes causes the witness to change their testimony. When finding inconsistencies in the testimony, the player may choose Present in order to show a piece of evidence that they think contradicts the testimony. The player has a health bar, representing the judge's patience. If the player presents incorrect pieces of evidence or choose incorrect answers to questions in court, health is lost. If the health bar reaches zero, the player loses the game and their client is declared guilty. A new system, known as the "Perceive System," can be used to look for motions or actions made by witnesses that show nervousness, similar to a tell in poker. The game also includes a "Crime Recreation Mode" that models evidence or the crime scene in a 3-D rendition and allow the player to explore the recreation to look for clues. Additionally, the game often recreates the crime in cutscene sequences, allowing the player to observe the action and find contradictions.

== Synopsis ==
=== Setting and characters ===
Apollo Justice: Ace Attorney takes place seven years after the events of Phoenix Wright: Ace Attorney – Trials and Tribulations. Like previous Ace Attorney games, it consists of several cases, or "Turnabouts". In each, the protagonist, Apollo Justice, must prove the innocence of a client accused of murder using evidence and testimony. Once the opening level is concluded, he is hired to work in the offices of former series protagonist Phoenix Wright, who has since been disbarred from practicing law and has become a piano player and professional gambler to support his adopted daughter Trucy Wright, a young magician who becomes Apollo's trusted assistant and fellow investigator.

=== Story ===
Apollo and his mentor Kristoph Gavin are called to represent ex-attorney Phoenix Wright, charged with murdering his opponent Shadi Smith during a game of poker. Phoenix names Kristoph as a witness to the incident, and with the help of falsified evidence provided by his daughter Trucy, exposes him as the real murderer. Impressed by Apollo's performance, he invites him to work for him through Trucy's talent agency. Angry over Wright's use of falsified evidence, Apollo punches him.

A few months later, Apollo reluctantly accepts, and is assigned to investigate three separate incidents: a hit and run involving Phoenix, the theft of a noodle vendor's cart, and the disappearance of Trucy's favorite pair of panties. At the same time, the Kitaki crime family hires him to defend the boss' son, Wocky Kitaki, in a murder trial concerning the death of his doctor Pal Meraktis. By connecting the incidents to evidence recovered with the help of Detective Ema Skye, Apollo proves that Wocky's fiancée and Meraktis' old employee, Alita Tiala, committed the crime to prevent Meraktis revealing that he and Alita hid a medical condition from Wocky.

Later, prosecutor Klavier Gavin, Kristoph's brother, invites Apollo and Trucy to attend a concert for his band, the Gavinners. During a guest performance by singer Lamiroir, her manager Romein LeTouse is killed in her dressing room. When Machi Tobaye, Lamiroir's pianist, is accused of LeTouse's murder, Apollo investigates and discovers that Gavin's bandmate Detective Daryan Crescend conspired with Tobaye to smuggle contraband into the country, and that LeTouse, an undercover Interpol agent, was murdered because he was onto the smuggling plot. Apollo's case against Daryan nearly falls apart due to a lack of decisive evidence, but Apollo is able to get Daryan convicted by convincing Tobaye to testify against him; Tobaye and Daryan are subsequently arrested.

Apollo is later selected to serve as the defense in an experimental jury-style trial system organized by Phoenix, called the "Jurist System". His client, artist Vera Misham, is accused of poisoning her father Drew, a professional forger. Apollo proves that Vera is actually the forger, but she succumbs to poison while testifying; the jurists are then instructed by Phoenix, who is the chair of the Jurist Simulated Court Committee, to play a "game" using the "MASON System", which simulates Phoenix's personal investigations. Seven years earlier, while representing magician Zak Gramarye in court, Phoenix was tricked into using false evidence created by Vera, costing him both his reputation and job. Zak subsequently disappeared, leaving his daughter Trucy in Phoenix's custody. Over the years, Phoenix uses his experience and connections to uncover the truth: Trucy and Apollo are half-siblings gifted with a unique power of perception inherited through their mother, Thalassa Gramarye. Furthermore, Zak was forced to abandon Trucy in order to honor the wishes of her grandfather, who passed the legal rights to his magic to her side of the family. It also transpires that Zak was Shadi Smith, who had come to give the rights to Magnifi's magic to Trucy before being killed by Kristoph.

Kristoph is summoned to testify under suspicion of poisoning Vera, revealing that he was Zak's original attorney before being fired, and had requested the creation of the false evidence from the Mishams in order to win the high-profile case and become famous. Apollo accuses Kristoph of setting up Phoenix with the false evidence after being fired to get revenge on him and Zak, and of attempting to kill everyone related to the case out of fear of being found out. Following the final arguments, the player takes control of Lamiroir, who is one of the jurists for the case, and must decide whether or not Vera is guilty. If "Not Guilty" is chosen, then Vera is found not guilty by unanimous vote and recovers from her poisoning. With his name cleared, Phoenix considers applying for readmission to the bar and assures Lamiroir, who is Thalassa in disguise, that he will watch over Apollo and Trucy.

If "Guilty" is chosen, it triggers a bad ending in which a hung jury forces the court to delay the verdict, only for Vera to die from her poisoning that night, leaving the case unresolved.

== Development ==
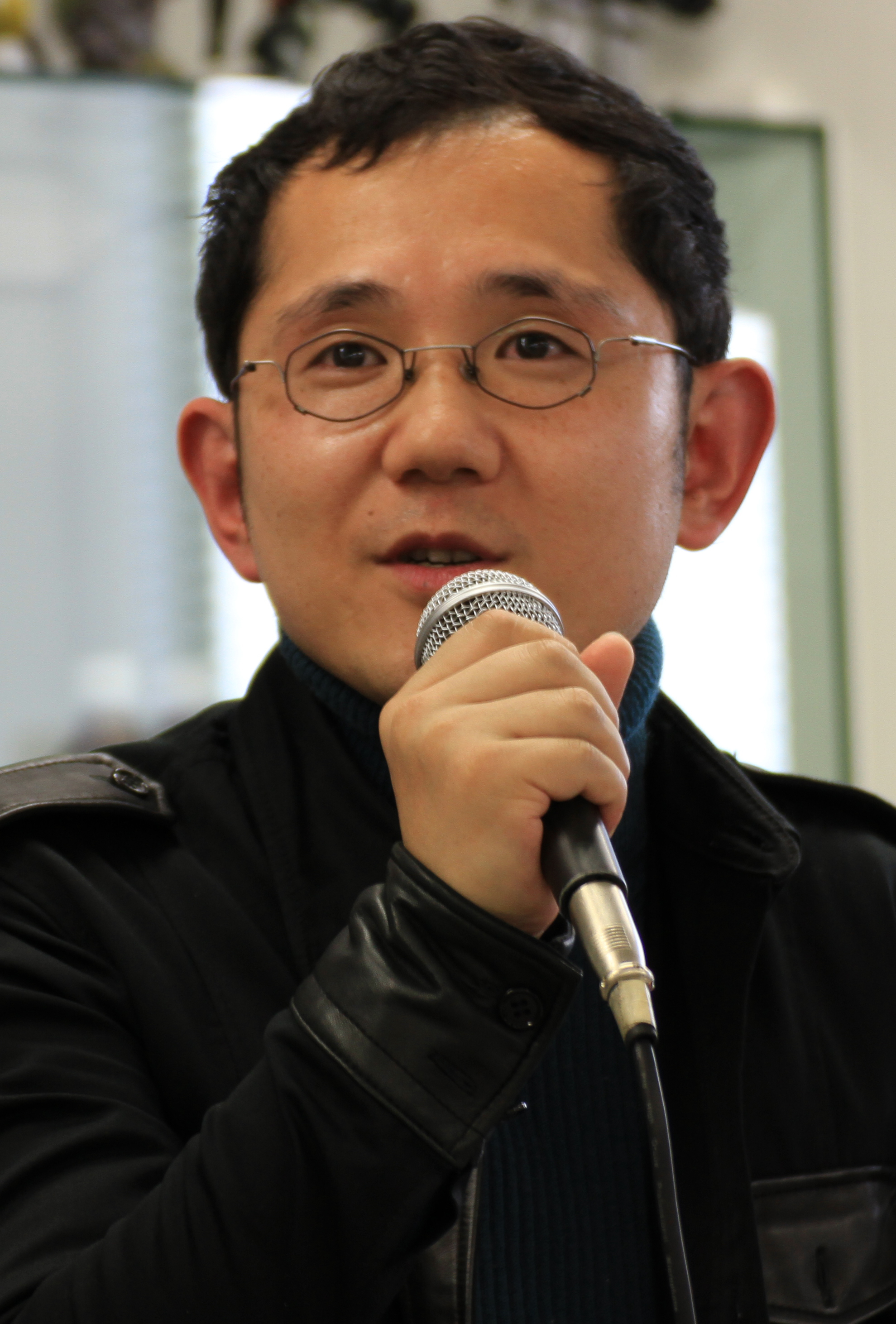
Series creator Shu Takumi wanted the series to end with the previous game.

Apollo Justice was developed by a team of 28 staff members. It was produced by Minae Matsukawa and directed by Mitsuru Endo, with character design and art by Kazuya Nuri, while series creator Shu Takumi wrote the game's scenario and took on a supervisory role. Takumi had wanted the series to end with the previous game, as he felt its main character, Phoenix Wright, had been fully explored and that his story had been told; he said that it is important to know when to end a story, that he did not want the series to become a shadow of its former self, and that he did not see any reason to continue it. When it was still decided that a fourth game would be made, Takumi wanted it to have a new main character and a new story; he did not plan to have Phoenix appear in the game, but his colleagues wanted him in the game in some form, which led to him being the accused in the first case in the game.

Early in development, it was proposed that the game would use 3D graphics, as a way to make a big impact worthy of the start of a new Ace Attorney series; eventually they settled for a 2D style, with a few 3D elements. Apollo Justice was the first game in the series to feature videos created using motion-capture data. A male staff member of the Research & Development team was chosen to be the motion-capture actor for a female character; the producer described him as being "a natural" at it. Voice acting was also provided by Capcom staff members. During development, staff members visited real courts to watch and study the trials. Most of the game's music was composed by Toshihiko Horiyama, with Hideki Okugawa composing three songs and Akemi Kimura and Shu Takumi composing two songs each. A soundtrack album, Gyakuten Saiban 4 Original Soundtrack, was released on June 27, 2007. A concert, based on the music from Ace Attorney and entitled Gyakuten Meets Orchestra, took place in Tokyo in April 2008. A CD of the concert was published on July 16, 2008.

Alexander O. Smith, who worked as a writer on the localization of the first Ace Attorney game, also worked on the localization of Apollo Justice. Localization of the game was already in progress by August 2007. The name "Apollo Justice" was decided in collaboration between the Japanese and American divisions of Capcom; it took them twenty-two meetings to decide on it. During the localization, there was some debate about the use of the word "panties" to describe Trucy Wright's magical bloomers, a prop she uses in her magic shows; some on the localization team felt that it was inappropriate to joke about an underage girl's panties, and wanted them to be localized as "magic pants", while some felt that the joke would be lost if the player already knew that they were massive bloomers. Janet Hsu, one of the staff members working on the localization, made an argument for "emotional accuracy", saying that the Japanese version of the game was trying to make the player feel at unease over looking for what they might imagine to be "sexy lingerie", and then let the player feel relief at finding out that it is a prop for a magic show. In the end, they were referred to as "panties".

=== Release and compilation ===
The game was announced in 2005, and was originally planned to be released in 2006 in Japan. A demo version of the game was first made available at Tokyo Game Show in 2006, and an English trailer was presented at the following year's Tokyo Game Show. The game was eventually released in Japan on April 12, 2007, with North American, European, and Australian releases following on February 19, 2008, May 9, 2008, and May 22, 2008, respectively; the Australian release was handled by Nintendo Australia. In Japan, a limited edition of the game was made available. It includes branded headphones, an Ace Attorney encyclopedia of the first three games on a DS card titled Gyakuten Saiban Jiten, and a series highlights DVD. A keychain depicting Apollo was included with preorders purchased at GameStop and the online Capcom store.

A new version with high-resolution graphics was released in English and Japanese for iOS on December 1, 2016 and for Android on December 8. A Nintendo 3DS version was released digitally on November 21, 2017 in North America and on November 23 in Europe, and was released both digitally and physically in Japan on November 22, 2017. It was also released on January 25, 2024 on Nintendo Switch, PlayStation 4, Windows and Xbox One, as part of the Apollo Justice: Ace Attorney Trilogy compilation, alongside its sequels Dual Destinies and Spirit of Justice, all of which are using the RE Engine.

== Reception ==
Reception

Aggregate score
Aggregator	Score
Metacritic	DS/iOS: 78/100; 3DS: 77/100

Review scores
Publication	Score
1Up.com	A−
Eurogamer	8/10
Famitsu	36/40
GamePro	3.75/5
GameSpot	7/10
GameSpy	4/5
IGN	8.3/10
Official Nintendo Magazine	82%
TouchArcade	iOS: 4/5

Apollo Justice: Ace Attorney was well received by critics. 1UP.com commented that, "the Phoenix Wright games are by far the best-written titles you'll find on the DS, and Justice is no different." 1UP.com also commented that the added features made especially for the DS were "super engaging even though the actual actions aren't that difficult to do." On 21 November 2013, RPGFan placed the game 5th on their top 20 Nintendo DS games list. The Nintendo 3DS version was the tenth highest rated game of 2017 for the platform on the review aggregator Metacritic.

IGN largely agreed with 1UP but commented that "the first Apollo Justice title plays identically to the Phoenix Wright trilogy". IGN Australia noted out that complaints about the previous games, such as that "finding the right path through the game feels like a process of trial and error" and that players could beat the game by "routinely pressing at every available opportunity and then using a minimum of logic," were not fixed in Apollo Justice. Additionally, "the game's rather obtuse, long-way-around approach to problem solving" caused what IGN viewed to be unnecessary delays to the game. IGN also felt that new features were "a little gimmicky" but did not "detract from the experience in the slightest." However, IGN Australia thought the game was "great" overall. The game was nominated for "Best Story" in IGN's 2008 Video Game Awards, though it did not win.

These views were echoed by many reviews. GameSpot felt that the story, while strong, "moves along at a snail's pace" and that "many of the series' flaws are still present." A "lack of innovation and change" was the main sticking point for GamePro, who thought of Apollo Justice as "a solid distillation of the franchise formula." The Nintendo World Report felt that the game "builds upon the Phoenix Wright trilogy" even though "gameplay remains mostly unchanged." GameSpy pointed out that the game's use of the DS's touch features, "vastly improves the experience" though the crime scene reenactment is "all too brief."

=== Sales ===
Apollo Justice sold around 250,000 copies during the first retail week, and had more than 500,000 copies shipped by the end of its second week in Japan. By the end of 2007, it had sold 515,417 units. The game performed well commercially in North America, charting as the fifth best selling Nintendo DS game in the region during its release week. The Nintendo 3DS version was the fourteenth best selling game in Japan during its debut week, selling 4,832 copies.
