= Gary Berland =

American poker player (1950–1988)

- Nickname: Bones
- Born: May 9, 1950; Gardena, California, U.S.
- Died: February 6, 1988 (aged 37)

World Series of Poker
- Bracelets: 5
- Money finishes: 11
- Highest WSOP Main Event finish: 2nd, 1977

Gary "Bones" Berland (May 9, 1950 – February 6, 1988) was an American professional poker player who won five World Series of Poker bracelets.

== Early life ==
Berland was born and raised in Gardena, California. He moved to Las Vegas, Nevada with his family in 1968 and attended UNLV. He dropped out of college after two years to become a full-time professional poker player. He also worked as a poker dealer during his early years as a poker player to supplement his income and help build his bankroll.

== Poker career ==
Berland finished runner-up to Doyle Brunson in the 1977 World Series of Poker (WSOP) $10,000 no limit Texas hold'em main event, but did not cash because the tournament had a winner-take-all format until 1978. In 1978, Berland won the $500 Seven Card Stud and the $1,000 Seven Card Razz events. His total winnings for these were more than $36,000. Berland also finished third in the 1986 Main Event. His total lifetime tournament winnings exceeded $300,000. Berland's 11 cashes at the World Series of Poker totaled $220,390.

According to Brunson, he died of a rare blood disorder.

=== World Series Of Poker Bracelets ===
Year	Tournament	Prize (US$)
1977	$500 Seven-Card Razz	$8,300
1978	$1,000 Seven-Card Razz	$19,200
1978	$500 Seven-Card Stud	$17,100
1979	$500 Seven-Card Stud	$24,000
1979	$1,000 Seven-Card Stud Hi/Lo	$20,400
