= 1979 World Series of Poker =

Series of poker tournaments

- Location: Binion's Horseshoe, Las Vegas, Nevada
- Dates: May 11 – 22

Champion
- (United States) Hal Fowler

The 1979 World Series of Poker (WSOP) was a series of poker tournaments held at Binion's Horseshoe in Las Vegas, Nevada, USA from May 11 to 22, 1979.

== Events ==
There were 11 preliminary events at the 1979 World Series of Poker. The 1979 WSOP featured the first designed tournament in WSOP history where two players won a bracelet for the same event. Moss became the first player in WSOP history to win seven career bracelets.

#	Date	Event	Entries	Winner	Prize	Runner-up	Results
1	May 11, 1979	$10,000 Deuce to Seven Draw	15	Bobby Baldwin (1/4)	$90,000	Byron Wolford	Results
2	May 12, 1979	$500 Seven Card Stud	80	Gary Berland (1/4)	$24,000	Mike Schnieberg	Results
3	May 13, 1979	$1,000 Seven Card Stud Split	34	Gary Berland (2/5)	$20,400	Puggy Pearson (0/4)	Results
4	May 14, 1979	$600 Mixed Doubles	25	Doyle Brunson (1/6) & Starla Brodie (1/1)	$4,500	Wayne Eister & Pat Eister	Results
5	May 15, 1979	$400 Ladies' Seven Card Stud	53	Barbara Freer (0/1)	$12,720	Pat Sovoia	Results
6	May 16, 1979	$1,500 No Limit Hold'em	85	Perry Green (1/3)	$76,500	Jim Bechtel	Results
7	May 17, 1979	$1,000 Ace to Five Draw	37	Lakewood Louie (1/2)	$22,200	J.W. Box	Results
8	May 18, 1979	$2,000 Draw High	19	Lakewood Louie (2/3)	$22,800	Jackie MIlls	Results
9	May 19, 1979	$1,000 Razz	37	Sam Mastrogiannis (1/1)	$22,200	Unknown	Results
10	May 20, 1979	$5,000 Seven Card Stud	16	Johnny Moss (1/7)	$48,000	Puggy Pearson (0/4)	Results
11	May 21, 1979	$1,000 No Limit Hold'em	97	Dewey Tomko (1/1)	$48,000	Duanne Hammrich	Results
12	May 22, 1979	$10,000 No Limit Hold'em	54	Hal Fowler (1/1)	$270,000	Bobby Hoff	Results

== Main Event ==
There were 54 entrants to the main event. Each paid $10,000 to enter the tournament. Fowler was the first amateur to win the WSOP Main Event.

=== Final table ===
Place	Name	Prize
1st	Hal Fowler	$270,000
2nd	Bobby Hoff	$108,000
3rd	George Huber	$81,000
4th	Sam Moon	$54,000
5th	Johnny Moss	$27,000
6th	Chip Reese	None
7th	Crandell Addington	None
8th	Sam Petrillo	None

=== Performance of past champions ===
- Day 1: Doyle Brunson, Sailor Roberts, Amarillo Slim
- Day 2: Puggy Pearson
- Day 3: Bobby Baldwin
