= Bobby Baldwin =

American poker player and casino executive

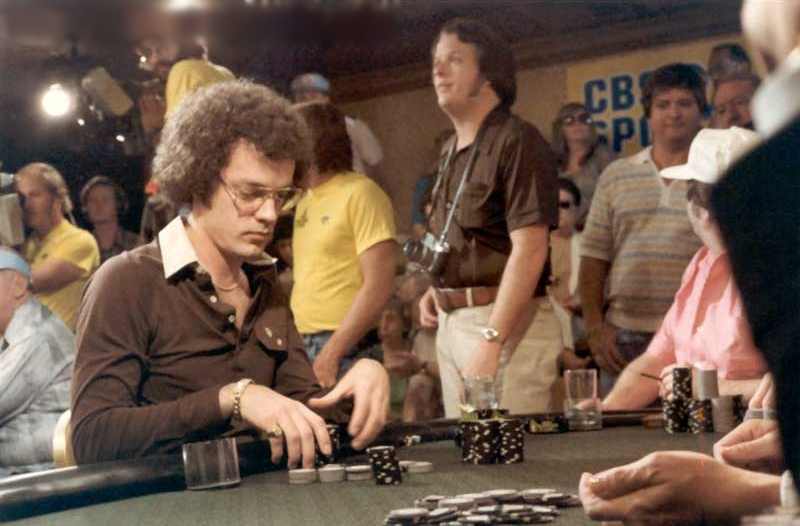
- Baldwin at the 1979 World Series of Poker
- Nickname: The Owl
- Born: 1950 or 1951 (age 75–76); Tulsa, Oklahoma, U.S.

World Series of Poker
- Bracelets: 4
- Money finishes: 20
- Highest WSOP Main Event finish: Winner, 1978

Bobby Baldwin (born c. 1950) is a professional poker player and casino executive. As a poker player, Baldwin is best known as the winner of the 1978 World Series of Poker Main Event, becoming the youngest Main Event champion at that time. In part due to his relative youth at the time he won the 1978 WSoP bracelet (aged 28), Baldwin has the earliest Main Event victory of any poker player alive.

Baldwin was born in Tulsa, Oklahoma, and attended Oklahoma State University in 1970. He currently resides in Las Vegas.

== Poker career ==
Baldwin won his first two bracelets at the 1977 World Series of Poker, first winning the $10,000 Deuce to Seven Draw event, then winning the $5,000 Seven-Card Stud event.

Baldwin won his largest tournament prize in 1978 when he won the WSOP Main Event, earning the title and the $210,000 first prize. He defeated a final table that included professional poker players Ken Smith, Jesse Alto, Buck Buchanan, WSOP bracelet winner Louis Sager Hunsucker Jr., and businessman Crandell Addington, whom Baldwin defeated in heads-up play.

When Baldwin won the 1978 World Series of Poker Main Event at age 28, he became the youngest winner in its history. His title of youngest winner was superseded by Stu Ungar in 1980.

In 1979, he won the $10,000 Deuce to Seven Draw event again, earning his fourth and most recent bracelet at the WSOP. Baldwin also competed in the Super Bowl of Poker tournaments, organized by 1972 world champion Amarillo Slim. Baldwin cashed in several SBOP events and won the $5,000 Seven Card Stud event in 1979.

His major wins include four WSOP bracelets, all won from 1977 to 1979. He won WSOP bracelets in three consecutive years (1977, 1978, and 1979) which only a small number of players have done in the history of the WSOP. In addition to his 1978 victory, Baldwin's other WSOP Main Event cashes are: 1981 (7th), 1986 (16th), 1987 (21st), 1991 (29th), 1992 (15th), 1994 (24th), and 2009 (352nd).

In 2003, Baldwin was inducted into the Poker Hall of Fame.

He cashed in the 2012 World Series of Poker in the Big One for One Drop, finishing seventh.

== Career as casino executive ==
In 1982, Baldwin became a consultant for the Golden Nugget casino, and in 1984 was named the president. He was selected to head The Mirage in 1987, and was named as the president of the Bellagio hotel and casino in 1998.

In 1999–2000, Baldwin was the chief financial officer of Mirage Resorts under Steve Wynn; in 2000, upon the merger of Mirage Resorts and MGM Grand, he became the chief executive officer of the Mirage Resorts subsidiary of MGM Mirage.

In 2005, after the acquisition of Mandalay Resort Group by MGM Mirage, Baldwin became CEO and President of the announced Project City Center, while continuing his responsibilities as CEO of the Mirage Resorts subsidiary. Baldwin now oversees additional resorts added through the Mandalay Resort Group buyout as well as the previous Wynn properties.

In 2018, following a lengthy tenure as Chief Customer Development Officer of MGM Resorts and CEO and President of CityCenter, MGM announced that Baldwin would leave both positions by the end of 2018.

== Other interests ==
In addition to poker, Baldwin is also known as a world-class billiards player. Baldwin and his playing style are the subject of a book entitled Bobby Baldwin's Winning Poker Secrets, which was written by Mike Caro. Baldwin has written many columns on poker and he authored a section for Doyle Brunson's Super/System. His own book Tales Out of Tulsa, a poker guide for novices, was published in 1985.

The high-stakes signature poker room in the Bellagio is named "Bobby's Room" after Baldwin.

As of 2012, his total live tournament winnings exceed $2,300,000. His 20 cashes at the WSOP account for $2,100,311 of those winnings.

== World Series of Poker bracelets ==
Year	Tournament	Prize
1977	$10,000 Deuce to Seven Draw	$80,000
1977	$5,000 Seven-Card Stud	$44,000
1978	$10,000 No Limit Hold'em World Championship	$210,000
1979	$10,000 Deuce to Seven Draw	$90,000
