= Phoenix Wright: Ace Attorney – Dual Destinies =

2013 video game

- English cover art, featuring the four main characters (from left to right) Phoenix Wright, Athena Cykes, Simon Blackquill, and Apollo Justice
- Developer: Capcom
- Publisher: Capcom
- Directors: Takeshi Yamazaki; Yasuhiro Seto
- Producer: Motohide Eshiro
- Designers: Natsuki Ikawa; Yoriki Daigo
- Artist: Takuro Fuse
- Writers: Takeshi Yamazaki; Yuki Nakamura; Hironao Fukuda
- Composer: Noriyuki Iwadare
- Series: Ace Attorney
- Engine: MT Framework Mobile; RE Engine (Apollo Justice Trilogy)
- Platforms: Nintendo 3DS, iOS, Android (Original); Meta VR Glasses, Meta Quest 3, Meta Quest 3S, Meta Quest Pro, Quest 2 (VR)
- Release: Nintendo 3DS: JP: July 25, 2013; WW: October 24, 2013; iOS: JP: August 7, 2014; WW: August 14, 2014; Android: WW: May 23, 2017; VR: WW: 2027
- Genres: Adventure, visual novel
- Mode: Single-player

Phoenix Wright: Ace Attorney – Dual Destinies (Note: Known in Japan as Gyakuten Saiban 5 (逆転裁判 5; lit. Turnabout Trial 5)) is a visual novel and adventure video game developed and published by Capcom. It is the fifth main entry (and seventh overall installment) in the Ace Attorney series, and was originally released for the Nintendo 3DS in 2013, with iOS and Android versions following in 2014 and 2017. It was also released for Nintendo Switch, PlayStation 4, Windows, and Xbox One in 2024 as part of the Apollo Justice: Ace Attorney Trilogy compilation.

The game is set around a year after the previous game, Apollo Justice: Ace Attorney, in a time when the court system has entered a dark era of false charges and fabricated evidence, caused in part by the event that led to Phoenix being unjustly disbarred. The player takes the roles of three defense attorneys Phoenix Wright, Apollo Justice and Athena Cykes, who defend their clients in multiple cases and try to restore confidence in the courts. The gameplay is split into investigation sections, where the player searches for evidence and talks to witnesses, and trials, where they search for inconsistencies between witness testimonies and the evidence. The player can use some character-specific gameplay mechanics: Phoenix can see "psyche-locks" over witnesses who are hiding something, Apollo can spot visual cues in witnesses that indicate deception, and Athena can detect conflicting emotions in witnesses' voices.

The development team included the producer Motohide Eshiro, the directors Takeshi Yamazaki and Yasuhiro Seto, and the composer Noriyuki Iwadare. Due to the game being made a long time after Apollo Justice, the developers wanted it to make a big impact, and came up with the idea of the player working to revive the trial system. As it was the first Ace Attorney game on the Nintendo 3DS, the developers made use of 3D graphics; they focused on preserving the look of the earlier Ace Attorney games' 2D art, and wanted to ensure that the graphics looked better than those in the simultaneously developed Professor Layton vs. Phoenix Wright: Ace Attorney. The game's localization was directed by Janet Hsu, and was incorporated into the overall development, allowing the localization team a larger degree of insight into the developers' intentions. The game was generally well received by critics, who praised the audio, visuals and character art, but criticized the game for sometimes not accepting logically valid input during trials. The game achieved the estimated sales, which were high compared to how the franchise had performed in the past.

== Gameplay ==
Dual Destinies introduces the "mood matrix", where the player searches for conflicting emotions in testimonies. Here, a character experiences happiness (top left) despite being in a stressful situation.

Dual Destinies is a visual novel and adventure game in which the player takes the roles of three defense attorneys: Phoenix Wright, Apollo Justice, and Athena Cykes. The player aims to solve multiple cases and get their clients declared not guilty, which is how the game's episodes are cleared.

The gameplay is split into two types of sections: investigations and trials. During investigations, the player goes to the crime scene, where they have access to a menu with four options: examine, which brings up a cursor used to search for evidence and clues; talk, which lets the player interview a witness at the current location, choosing from a number of a topics to discuss; present, which lets the player show the witness evidence; and move, which brings up a list of locations the player can choose to go to. At some points, the player can use Apollo's "perceive" mechanic to watch for visual cues in a witness as they are talking, such as a twitching eye, that indicate that they are lying. The player can also sometimes use Phoenix's "psyche-lock" mechanic to see locks on the hearts of witnesses who are hiding something.

During trials, the player cross-examines witnesses. They can move backwards and forwards through statements in the testimony, and can choose to press the witness for more information on a particular statement; sometimes, the witness will revise their testimony based on this. If the player spots a lie or a contradiction in the testimony, they can present evidence to demonstrate the contradiction. If the player presents incorrect evidence, the judge's confidence in the player will be lowered; if the judge's confidence in the player is depleted, the game ends.

At some points, the player can use Athena's "mood matrix" mechanic to detect conflicting emotions in witnesses' voices during their testimonies, such as sudden happiness in the middle of fear. Four different emotions can show up in testimony analyses – happiness, anger, shock, and sadness (the icon of which also represents fear) – which will light up with different intensity. The player goes through the testimony, and aims to determine the cause of the conflicting emotion. Near the end of trials, when the player is close to solving the case, they can use the "revisualization" mechanic to look back at known facts and make a series of deductions by picking the right choices, to reach a conclusion.

== Plot ==
=== Characters and setting ===
Dual Destinies takes place roughly a year after the events of the previous game, Apollo Justice: Ace Attorney. The legal system has entered an era known as "the dark age of the law", filled with false charges and fabricated evidence. The game features three playable protagonists: Phoenix Wright, the owner of the Wright Anything Agency who has retaken the bar exam to once again become a defense attorney; Apollo Justice, a junior attorney at the agency; and Athena Cykes, the agency's newest hire who specializes in analytical psychology. During their court cases, they frequently clash with Simon Blackquill, a practicing prosecutor despite being an inmate on death row for murder. Other characters include Trucy Wright, Phoenix's adoptive daughter; Miles Edgeworth, the district chief prosecutor and Phoenix's friend and rival; Pearl Fey, a spirit medium and Phoenix's friend; Juniper Woods, a law student and Athena's childhood friend; and Bobby Fulbright, an enthusiastic police detective who constantly claims to fight for justice.

=== Plot ===
After Athena Cykes - a defense attorney who specializes in analytical psychology - joins the Wright Anything Agency, Phoenix Wright tasks her and Apollo Justice with defending Damien Tenma, the mayor of Tenma Town, who is accused of murdering Nine Tails Vale alderman Rex Kyubi. Despite opposition from prosecutor Simon Blackquill and his detective partner Bobby Fulbright, Apollo and Athena expose Kyubi's real killer as Tenma's aide, Florent L'Belle, who had plotted to kill Kyubi and frame Tenma to gain access to Nine Tails Vale's treasure to pay off a huge debt.

Additional content set after these events tells the story of Phoenix's first case after regaining his badge, having to defend an orca accused of killing aquarium owner Jack Shipley. Investigating the case, Phoenix proves the orca innocent, only for her handler Sasha Buckler to be accused of the crime; Phoenix later determines Shipley's death was accidental, resulting from an attempt by employee Marlon Rimes to murder the orca out of revenge for an incident the year prior where the Orca allegedly killed Marlon's girlfriend Azura Summers, but Phoenix proves to Marlon that Azura died from a heart condition and not from the apparent Orca attack. Distraught, Marlon promises to atone for his crimes.

Afterward, Athena's friend Juniper Woods is charged with the murder of her teacher, Constance Courte. Athena takes her case and reveals the killer to be Courte's fellow teacher, Aristotle Means, who had killed Courte to protect himself after she discovered that he had been accepting bribes from student Hugh O'Conner's parents to give him good grades.

Sometime later, following a bombing at a space center, Apollo's friend Clay Terran is found murdered, and fellow astronaut Solomon Starbuck is declared the primary suspect, with Apollo and Athena taking on his defense. During Starbuck's trial, a bomb goes off in the courtroom, injuring Apollo and detective Candice Arme is killed in the process. Juniper is accused of both the bombing and Arme's murder, but Phoenix and Athena defend her and reveal bomb squad specialist Ted Tonate as the real culprit of both crimes. Feeling personally involved in the case, Apollo takes a leave of absence from the agency to investigate on his own while Phoenix takes over Solomon's case. He proves Solomon's innocence via the testimony of the space center's director Yuri Cosmos, but a new piece of evidence places Athena as the prime suspect in Clay's murder, resulting in her arrest.

Phoenix's investigation brings him to look into an incident seven years ago, in which Athena's mother Metis was killed and Blackquill was convicted for the murder after he confessed. Meanwhile, Tonate confesses to murdering Arme but pleads his innocence with regard to the courtroom bombing. With one day until Blackquill's planned execution, his sister Aura takes several people hostage, including Phoenix's daughter Trucy, demanding that a re-trial of the case be held to convict Athena for Metis' murder. With no time left to secure a proper courtroom, Phoenix decides to hold the trial in the courtroom destroyed in the earlier bombing. Together with chief prosecutor Miles Edgeworth, Phoenix deduces that a third party was responsible for the murder, proving both Blackquill's and Athena's innocence. Blackquill reveals that he confessed to the crime in order to protect Athena, while Athena reveals that she became a lawyer to one day prove Blackquill's innocence.

Edgeworth declares Blackquill a free man and places him back in charge as a prosecutor for the case while he retrieves vital information. Phoenix learns that the true culprit behind both Metis' and Clay's murders was the Phantom, an international spy that has disguised himself as Bobby Fulbright, who has actually been deceased for about a year now. The Phantom posed as Fulbright to steal evidence that would expose his true identity, fearing he would be killed by his enemies should it be revealed. To this end, he arranged the courtroom bombing to destroy a moonrock that would reveal his identity. With the assistance of Edgeworth, Blackquill, Apollo and Athena, Phoenix manages to break the normally emotionless Phantom, who is shot non-fatally by an unseen sniper. After proving the Phantom's guilt, the Wright Anything Agency sees Solomon off as he heads into space.

== Development ==
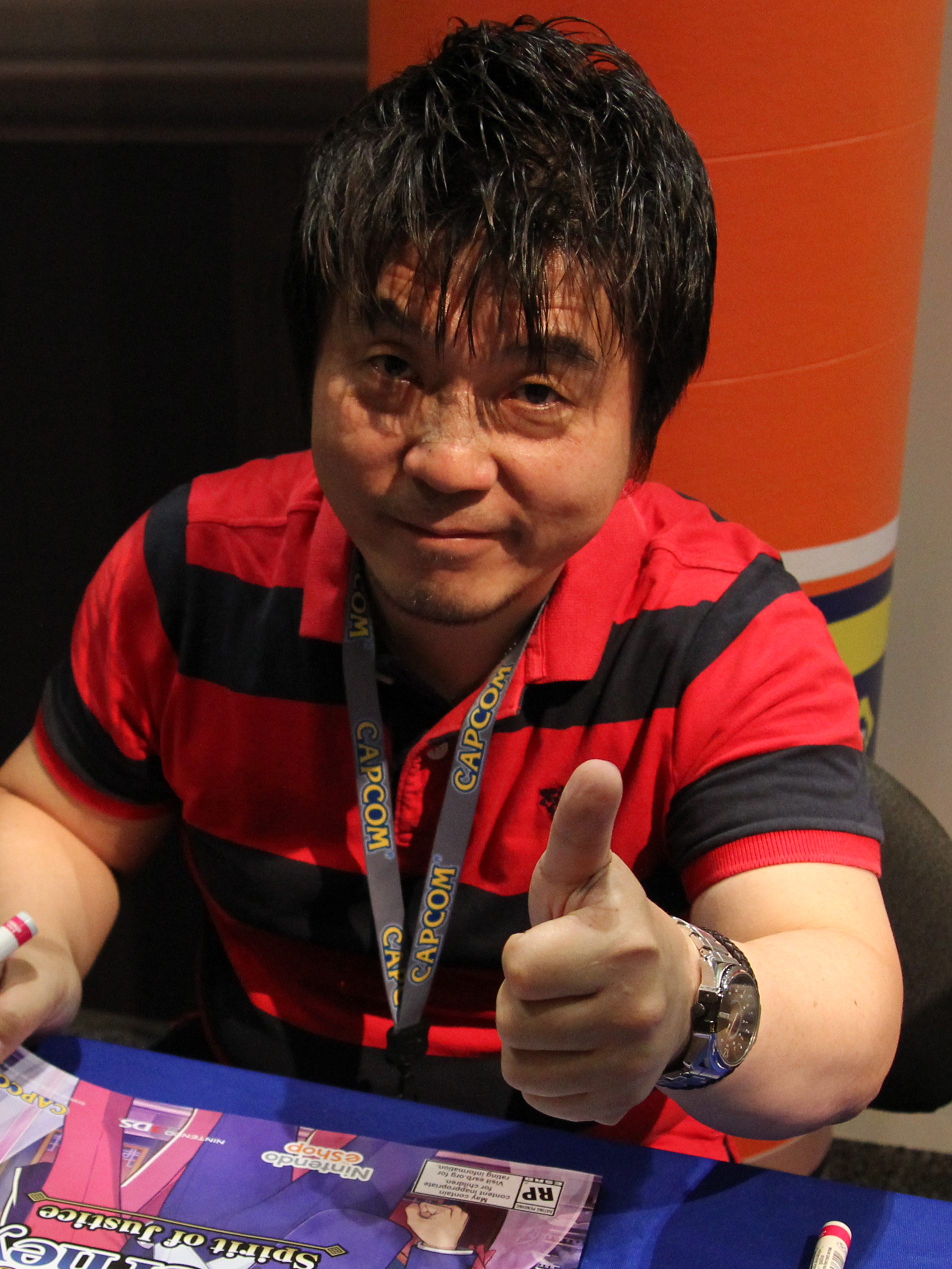
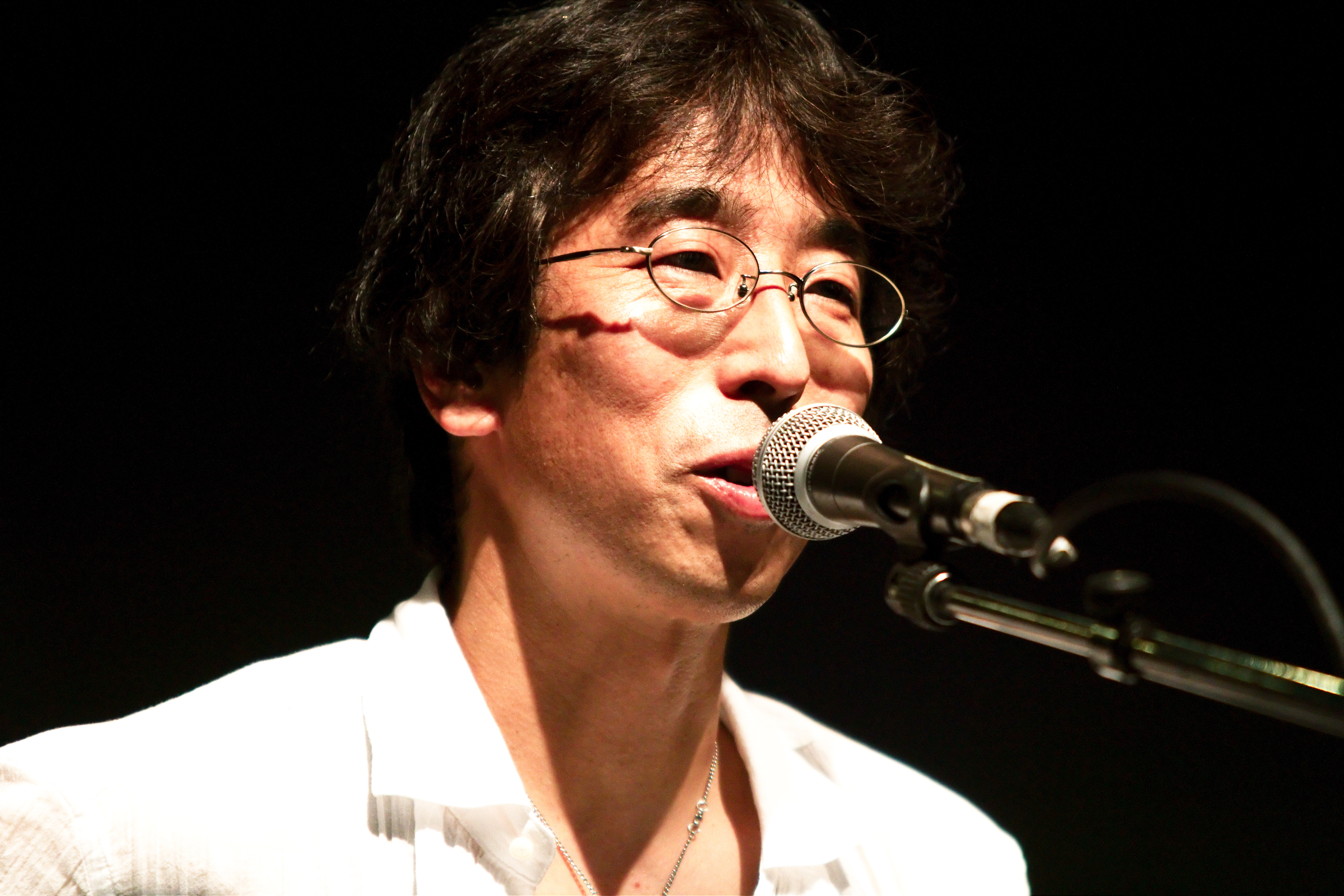
The game was produced by Motohide Eshiro (top), and features music by Noriyuki Iwadare (bottom).

Dual Destinies was produced by Motohide Eshiro and directed by Takeshi Yamazaki and Yasuhiro Seto, with music by Noriyuki Iwadare. Series creator Shu Takumi had no involvement in the title due to him focusing on Professor Layton vs. Phoenix Wright: Ace Attorney. The game was first announced in May 2007, a month after the release of the previous Ace Attorney game. In January 2012, almost five years after the original announcement, Capcom revealed the game's logotype during the celebration of the series' tenth anniversary. In September 2012, it was revealed that a demo would be available at Tokyo Game Show 2012, and that the game would be released on the Nintendo 3DS. It was developed using Capcom's game engine MT Framework Mobile.

When development began in 2011, only a few core staff members were working on the game, forming a skeleton team. At this time, Yamazaki said that the player should be able to use emotions and analytical psychology to reach the truth, in addition to using evidence: he thought that previous Ace Attorney games had only focused on evidence versus statements, and wanted to introduce a third element. Natsuki Ikawa, one of the game designers, read books on psychology and talked to the other staff members about what to do. She wrote down several ideas for how to handle it, including goggles that show the witness's personality as a specter, or a large computer that analyzes brain waves and heart rates, and showed them to Yamazaki, who would say "that's a pretty nifty idea" but still reject them; this contradiction between what he said and what he felt made Ikawa realize the basic concept for the mood matrix system, which was revised through feedback from everyone on the team and was implemented in the game. Another game designer, Yoriki Daigo, worked on several new features, including making the player able to move between locations freely and designing the revisualization system. Because the game was built from the ground up, the user interface for investigation sections was overhauled completely to be more visually appealing. The developers tried to keep the game simple, keeping it in line with Takumi's original vision of a game simple enough for his mother to play.

Sound effects from previous games, such as that of the judge's gavel, were remade for Dual Destinies: Toshihiko Horiyama, the game's sound director, re-imagined the original "crisp and dry" gavel effect as one where the initial sound of the gavel peaks early, leading into the richer sound of the gavel's core. He went through a similar process for all the effects, trying to both preserve the original sounds and revitalize them. After Horiyama came up with a sound concept, the game's sound designer, Amagishi, created the sound based on it. Because of the improved hardware capabilities of the Nintendo 3DS compared to the Nintendo DS, the development team was able to use unprocessed sounds of real instruments at some points in the music, such as in the title track, which features Iwadare playing the trombone. A feature was implemented where the game detects whether headphones are plugged into the Nintendo 3DS, and it adjusts the audio output to be optimal for the player's current setup. While Capcom staff provided all voice acting in previous Ace Attorney games, Dual Destinies instead used professional voice actors, with some smaller roles being handled by Capcom staff. Only the cutscenes are fully voiced; this was a deliberate choice, as the developers wanted to give the player the freedom to read dialogue in whatever kind of voice they want in their head. Eshiro also said that full voice acting would ruin the game's pacing and tempo.

Yamazaki focused on the game's scenario, while Seto worked as his "backup", ensuring that the development staff was all on the same page and that things go smoothly. According to Seto, Yamazaki was the person who had the most influence on the game, but his ideas sometimes clashed with Eshiro's, as Eshiro had to view the game as a product and give feedback based on that; the staff then had to create a compromise that both Yamazaki and Eshiro could accept. This led to long discussions, and eventually Seto had to make final decisions on what to do, which he called "no small task"; some big decisions took days to make.

=== Writing ===
Due to Dual Destinies being made long after the previous main game in the series, the developers felt that they needed it to make a big impact; they knew from the start that they wanted Phoenix Wright to return as the game's main character and as an attorney, since they had hinted at it at the end of the previous game. Additionally, they wanted to retain Apollo Justice as an important character, and not steal the spotlight from him, as he had already been established as a new main character. Feeling that Apollo's story had not been explored enough in the previous game, they focused on developing his character further in Dual Destinies, and added the character Athena Cykes as his junior. Yamazaki created Athena to be an active partner for Phoenix, rather than a "supporter in the background". The development team encountered problems while figuring out how to make the impact they wanted with the game with both Phoenix and Apollo, until they decided on the story concept of Phoenix and Apollo working to revive a collapsed trial system. From the start, Yamazaki knew that he wanted all three player characters to have their own motivations and purposes, which would play out throughout the game. At one point, he considered having five lawyers in the game, because of it being the fifth game in the series; he later called this idea crazy and overly ambitious, and felt that they had "dodged a bullet" by not using it.

The development team intended to continue the story of the previous game in the series in every way with Dual Destinies. They focused on an overarching story and plot twists, and on characters' motives and how they get involved in the story, but not directly on the characters themselves. When deciding which characters to bring back from previous games, they did not want to bring back anyone only for the sake of bringing them back, instead intending for everyone to have important roles in the story. They considered some characters to "come in sets", such as Apollo and Trucy, which affected which characters to bring back. Miles Edgeworth was brought back as the developers felt that Phoenix needed a character to play off of. Yamazaki said it was difficult to create the new rival character Simon Blackquill, as he had to be at least as unique and memorable as the ones in previous Ace Attorney titles. He came up with the idea that Blackquill would be a convict, thus being the "most criminal prosecutor yet". Blackquill's intelligence and use of psychological manipulation turned out to make trials challenging to write, as Yamazaki kept writing himself into a corner, with it being difficult to come up with a way for the protagonist to win. Yamazaki went through several ideas when brainstorming ways for Blackquill to be seen as a difficult opponent, such as making him immortal and two hundred years old, or "super-rich" and able to buy off any witness; these ideas were scrapped due to not fitting into the Ace Attorney series.

When writing the cases, Yamazaki would usually come up with the twist of the case first; he would think of something shocking or a surprising event, as well as the setting and set-up of the episode. He would then figure out how it could logically have happened, which he said was the most compelling method, story-wise; if it were done in the other direction – starting with how the case would work logically and then adding a twist - he found that it would not "ring true". He found that coming up with ways of resolving these mysteries was very difficult compared to coming up with the set-up. He worked towards including story developments that would "keep [the player] guessing", and puzzles that "appeal to their curiosity". He tried to create scenarios that make the player interested, which resulted in the bombing in the first episode and how the second episode's murderer appears to be a mythical creature. Among scrapped ideas for the episodes were a case of an "ethereal murder" where the suspect remembers killing someone but there is no body and no evidence of it even happening, and a case where a doll has been killed. He noted that these ideas, while having an impact and sounding interesting, were unrealistic and would not work. Yamazaki took inspirations from several different kinds of stories, including books, movies and television; the second episode in particular was inspired by the works of the author Natsuhiko Kyogoku.

The development team included a scripting team, who inserted pre-programmed scripts into the dialogue, a process referred to as scripting: these scripts could be used to change characters' animations, stop the text in the middle of a sentence, automatically proceed to the next text box, and pan the camera. The staff had to envision how scenes would look, and used these scripts to create a flow of character animations and add dramatic tension, such as adding a pause after a character sighs to increase the dramatic effect.

The downloadable episode Turnabout Reclaimed was written by the game designer Yuki Nakamura, with the concept of "lighthearted fun" to set it apart from the main game. The first thing she decided on was to feature an orca, and have the story take place in an aquarium; it took her several tries to decide on the rest of the story. One of the scrapped ideas involved the orca stealing treasures from the aquarium and attacking people by the shore during its escape to the sea, with the episode's mystery involving the reason for the orca's behavior. The opening for this draft would have involved guards and detective Fulbright vaguely referring to someone escaping; the intention was that the player would think they were talking about Blackquill, before it was revealed to be the orca.

=== Visuals and character design ===
The developers focused on preserving the look of earlier games' 2D art: they created a concept model (top), and refined it until the entire team was satisfied (bottom).

Dual Destinies was the first game in the main series to be developed for the Nintendo 3DS; this move from the Nintendo DS to the Nintendo 3DS was the most difficult part of the development, with the development team being unsure of whether to use 2D graphics like with previous games or to use 3D models. Eventually they decided to use 3D graphics, because of the stereoscopic 3D effect being a selling point for the Nintendo 3DS system. They were also convinced of using 3D graphics following the release of the crossover title Professor Layton vs. Phoenix Wright: Ace Attorney, which used 3D graphics, demonstrating that the 3DS was now powerful enough to support 3D rendering. Because of the move to 3D, the in-house artist Takuro Fuse was in charge of the art direction, rather than the series regular Tatsuro Iwamoto, so that they could have meetings about the art more often. This was Fuse's first work on the main series, so he initially had problems with making character designs that fit the series, and had to get a lot of feedback from Eshiro. According to Eshiro and Yamazaki, they put effort into the graphics, wanting to ensure that Dual Destinies' graphics looked better than those of Professor Layton vs. Phoenix Wright: Ace Attorney.

The first thing Fuse and his art team had to do was figuring out how to create 3D models that preserve the look and feel of the previous games' 2D sprites, even when viewed in stereoscopic 3D. Some of the artists on the team created a concept trailer for how the game's visuals would work, featuring a 3D model of Phoenix. Looking back at it, Fuse called the model "cringe-worthy", but it was able to be used as a base. Everyone on the development team gave feedback on the model, and it was continuously refined until everyone was satisfied with its look; this process alone took six months. The art team also wanted to preserve the "lively" style of animation used in the 2D sprites. To do this, they used "various tricks" such as using different character models for different angles. They also took advantage of the increased capabilities of the Nintendo 3DS hardware, and added camera movements and connecting animations to give the character animation further fluidity.

Fuse found Athena difficult to design, due to her being both an assistant to Phoenix and Apollo, and a strong-willed attorney who wants to prove her capabilities in court. He designed her hairstyle based on how she would be standing on the left of Phoenix or Apollo when assisting them, making sure that it looked good from that perspective. He also created the hairstyle to be able to convey Athena's enthusiasm and energy through its movements. He gave Athena the little gadget named Widget, that hangs around her neck, to visually represent the mood matrix. As they wanted other characters to be able to see the mood matrix, it was decided to make Widget project the mood matrix as a hologram. The mood matrix itself, which needed to represent people's mental state visually, was a challenge for the art team. They eventually decided to use the vastness of outer space and the Earth in the design, and ended up using a portable planetarium as the base motif. This also influenced the mood matrix background music, which Fuse described as having an "outer space feel".

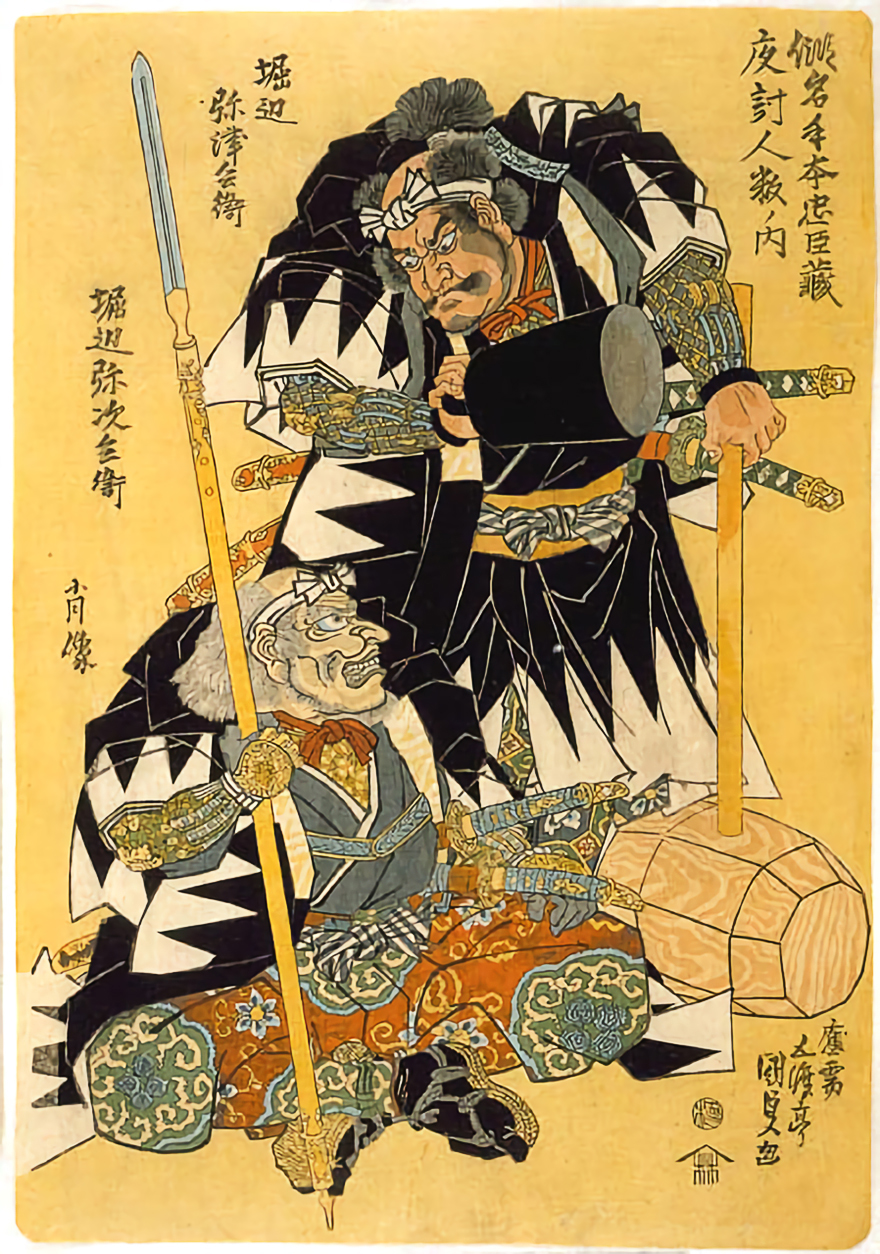
Blackquill's black-and-white prison uniform reminded Fuse of the 47 Ronin, leading him to use Japanese clothing in the design.

When designing Simon Blackquill, the new rival prosecutor character, Fuse initially intended to make him different from all previous Ace Attorney prosecutors and focusing almost entirely on the convict aspect of Blackquill, making him look like a "total criminal". At this point in development, Blackquill was intended to be the character who could analyze emotions based on voices, so he was given a headgear to wear. Next, Fuse put more focus on the prosecutor aspect, but ended up with a design that he described as "just another prosecutor"; he realized that the prosecutor and convict aspects were opposites, with one decreasing as the other increases.

The black-and-white stripes on the prisoner's uniform in the first design reminded Fuse of the Forty-seven Ronin, who wore black and white; this led him to incorporate traditional Japanese clothing into the design. He called this the key to solving the problem, but still had further issues with the design: if he made the outfit too Japanese, Blackquill would not look like an Ace Attorney prosecutor, and he thought it would be strange if he gave him a katana like an actual ronin, since Blackquill is a convict, and even average citizens are not legally allowed to carry swords. He realized that he could use a combination of Japanese black-and-white clothes and prosecutorial Western clothes found in the Meiji era, when Japan was Westernized. As they needed the character to look "sharp and stylish in Western clothing", the only direct indication of him being a convict in the end was his shackles. His messy ponytail was also used to convey a feeling of "long incarceration", as well as evoke the image of a ronin. Blackquill's hawk, Taka, was initially just meant as a part of the Japanese elements of the design, being reminiscent of Japanese falconers. Taka's role was eventually extended to bringing documents and evidence to Blackquill, highlighting how Blackquill's movements are hindered by his shackles. Fuse described the final design as looking like a "Meiji Restoration-era fighter".

=== Cutscenes ===
Dual Destinies features animated cutscenes produced by the animation studio Bones, which were directed by Seto at Capcom and Kenji Nagasaki at Bones. The scripts for these were drafted by Yamazaki, and included characters' lines as well as the general events and backgrounds for each scene. After the scripts were written, they were sent to Nagasaki, who drew storyboards for the scenes. When boarding the sequences, he added suggestions for details and nuances; for instance, in the script for one scene, Athena was going to trip and fall over, while Nagasaki suggested and boarded her tumbling down stairs, and added a guard character for her to interact with at the end of the scene to emphasize how painful the fall had been. After finalizing the scene, the team at Bones worked on the background art; while the courtrooms and defendant lobbies are shown in-game, the courthouse's stairway and main hall had not been shown before, and had to be designed specifically for the cutscenes.

After the different components of a scene were finished, the team at Bones created its layout art; this included things such as determining the camera position throughout the scene and how movements would be done. The developers wanted to focus on how the characters' faces were drawn and animated, and make sure that the characters matched their respective in-game 3D models, so Fuse gave detailed feedback on the layouts, and drew over them in red to indicate what he wanted to be changed. These changes included corrections to off-model drawings, facial expressions, body postures, and character acting. Once the layouts had been approved, the animators drew the key animation, after which the in-between frames were drawn. Once the animated footage was completed, it was put together and rendered in stereoscopic 3D. Voice acting, music, sound effects, sound leveling and remixing was then done, and added to the cutscene.

== Localization ==
Capcom announced a localization for the North American and European market in September 2012; at the time, they had planned a localization for about two years. Capcom USA's then senior vice president, Christian Svensson, described the game's sales forecasts as high compared to the commercial performance of past Ace Attorney titles, which was necessary to get a Western release greenlit.

The localization was directed by Janet Hsu, a series regular who previously worked on Ace Attorney as the localization lead and lead translator. As the localization team wanted to work closer with the developers on Dual Destinies than they had on previous games, the localization work was incorporated into the overall development of the game. This gave them a larger degree of insight into the developers' intentions with the game, helping them with localizing the game more faithfully. The localizers also had more control over the pre-programmed dialogue scripts in Dual Destinies than they had in any of the previous Ace Attorney games: they were able to use an internally developed tool to transfer the scripts from the Japanese dialogue to the English one; the development staff would put the scripts in the general area they belonged in for each sentence, after which Hsu would adjust the placement to increase the dramatic impact, for instance by having a dramatic pause and finger-pointing animation occur at a specific word. Due to Japanese word order being different from English, Hsu sometimes had to add words to "push" a big reveal into the second half of the sentence or rearrange the order facts were revealed in, to make revelations line up with dramatic animations or camera zooms.

Hsu described the localization work as a balancing act, and said that continuity and consistency was very important. To avoid situations where a small detail in one game is changed in localization, and then comes back as a major point in a sequel, Hsu avoided changing things unless necessary, such as when something in the original would not be understood by the target audience. One thing the localization team had to keep in mind was keeping the writing in-character: when substituting a Japanese joke with an English one, they had to consider whether it would be something that the character would say, and not simply that it was funny. They also worked towards having puns and references be appropriate for the dialogue, so that the dialogue still makes sense to players who do not get the reference or pun.

=== Characterization and naming ===
One of the first major decisions was how to localize character names. Hsu said that if character names sound too foreign and do not have any unconscious associations attached, rooted in the player's culture and language, they just come across as a "jumble of sounds" to the player, serving no purpose; they felt that the localized names, like the originals, should strive to convey certain images and feelings to the player. They said that this was particularly important in Ace Attorney, due to how integral each name is to its respective character. Hsu and the translators brainstormed ideas, and eliminated suggestions until they had a final name for each character. These names are puns or have meanings: Athena Cykes' first name is a continuation of the series tradition of naming protagonists after mythological creatures or gods. The reason for spelling "Cykes" with a C instead of using the more common spelling "Sykes" came from how "Sykes" was considered too similar to the previous character Ema Skye's name, and how the shape of the letter C connects to the crescent moon motifs in the mood matrix, her glove and her earring. Widget was localized to use male pronouns because of his Japanese name, Monita (モニ太), which uses the kanji character "ta" (太) from the name Tarou (太郎), and which is often used to create "generic-sounding little boy’s name out of a noun". Widget's English name was chosen to sound little and cute, similarly to the Japanese version's use of "ta" (太) rather than the usual way of writing "Monita" with the katakana character "ta" (タ).

While Simon Blackquill speaks in an old-fashioned and "rough" way in the Japanese version, matching what a ronin would be expected to sound like, Hsu said that this cultural shorthand of a ronin character did not exist in the West to build his character upon, so his characterization had to be rendered in a different way to be more accessible to Western players. Hsu and the translators had the same problem with this as Fuse had when balancing the prosecutor and convict aspects of the character, but eventually leaned more towards the prosecutor side, and made him speak Victorian English. They felt that this made more sense than portraying him as a cursing delinquent due to his high intelligence, and his Victorian-era clothes, due to their different cultural connotations in the West compared to Japan.

In the localization, they labeled him a samurai rather than a ronin – which is a subset of samurai – due to samurai being more recognizable and readily understood for Western players. They still portrayed him as a "rude jerk", as they were able to preserve that aspect through word choice: Hsu said that both Japanese and English from the Victorian era could be verbose, making the two styles blend naturally during Blackquill's "samurai" sword metaphors. Blackquill's localized name was developed together with his manner of speech, and like with previous prosecutor characters, it was chosen to not be an "overt pun", but rather a name with a double meaning that describes him. His surname comes from how he wears a samurai battle surcoat: these coats commonly feature the wearer's family crest. The crest on Blackquill's coat features a black-and-white feather, so his name was based on the color ("black") and the feather ("quill"). It was also made in reference to the character John Blackthorne from the novel Shōgun. The name was intended to sound like a "Victorian villain", to match his localized characterization and manner of speech.

=== Visual changes and dubbing ===
Localizing backgrounds was more difficult than it had been in previous games: while the earlier games used 2D illustrations as backgrounds, which could be changed, Dual Destinies uses 3D models, hindering the localization team from changing the shape of objects without risking encountering bugs. Because of this, Hsu described some objects as not feeling right; the most prominent type of object affected by this was signs with vertical text, which they said did not feel as natural in English as in Japanese. Some aspects of the user interface had to be modified as part of the localization: for instance, some text had to be moved around on the save file screen because of some words being longer in English than in Japanese, and a smaller font was chosen for the investigation notes to allow for multiple lines of text. For the dialogue box, a thin condensed font was chosen, and the box itself was elongated, to make room for as much text as in previous games. They only used two lines of text for it, both to look visually pleasing and to avoid hiding important detail behind a taller box.

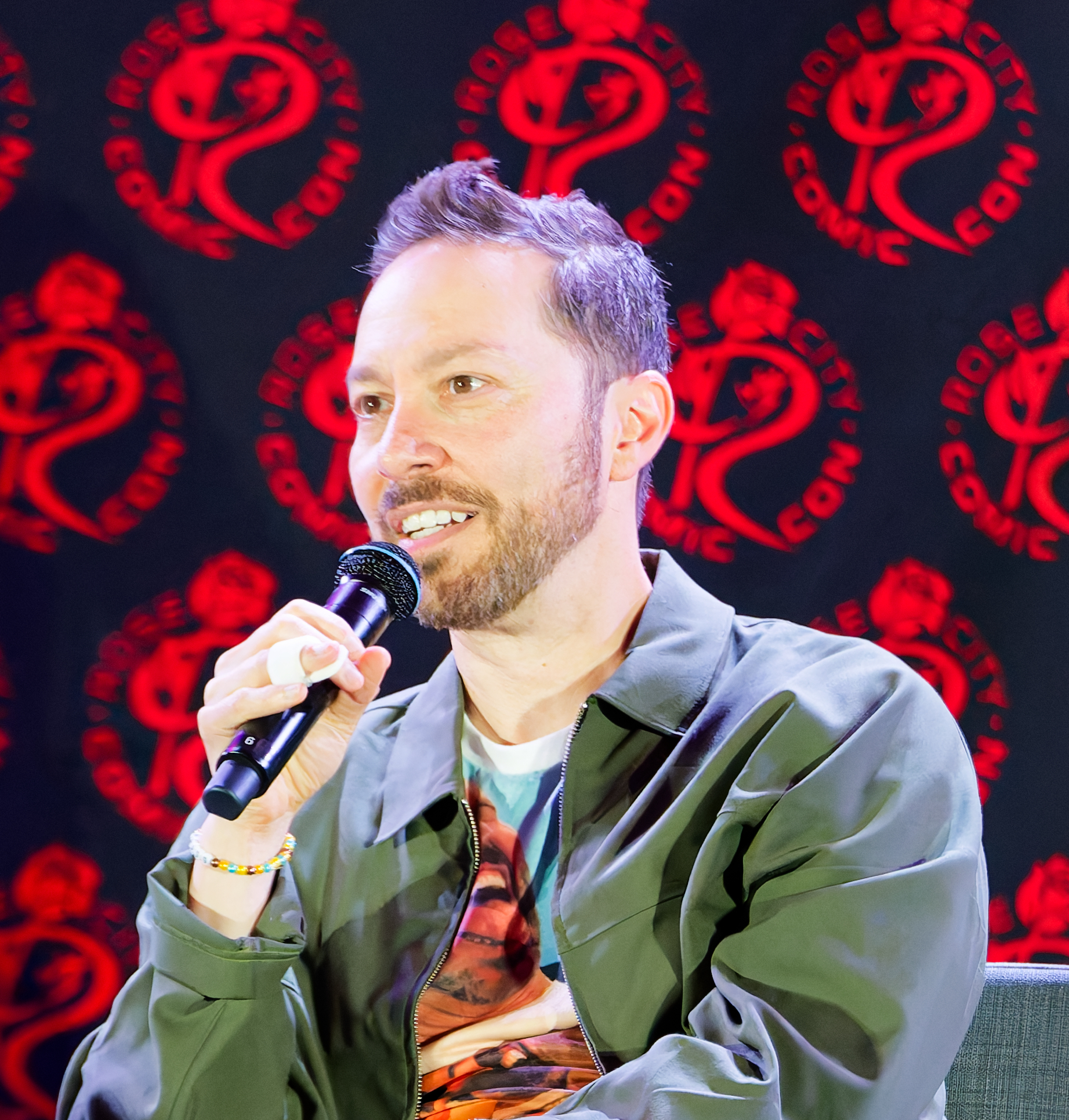
Sam Riegel directed the dubbing, and voiced Phoenix.

For the cutscenes, the localization team took into account that the animation had been done to the Japanese lines, so they made sure that the English script matched the already set lip flaps and timing. Because the Japanese voice acting was not yet recorded when Hsu worked on the English dub script, they used their imagination to guess what the Japanese voice acting would be like based on the script; this was made easier due to their familiarity with "standard anime conventions" from frequently watching anime. For some dialogue, they wrote alternative lines, as the footage had not yet been finished, and the script could be interpreted in different ways: in one scene, where Phoenix speaks on the phone, Hsu had him follow the line "It's for this very reason I returned" with either "Time to bring it to an end" or "To put an end to it all"; they used the former because of how there was a dramatic pause between the two lines.

The English dub was recorded at Cup of Tea Productions, and was directed by Sam Riegel, who also voiced Phoenix, having previously voiced the role in Ultimate Marvel vs. Capcom 3. Hsu was present for the recording, as they knew the story and was the translator of the scripts, and thus could explain what was happening in each scene and what the motivations behind the lines were, as well as how they wanted the voice actors to deliver certain lines. Because Horiyama had attended the Japanese voice recording sessions, he was also present, so he could give advice about things that sounded too different from the Japanese version, and give consultation about technical issues within the game. The voice actors took turns recording their lines to near-final versions of the cutscenes, so they could match the characters' lip flaps. In addition to the voice acting, some sound effects had to be localized, due to sound being used differently in Japanese and Western films, resulting in different things sounding natural; one such case was the opening cutscene for the fourth episode. Due to the English voice acting occasionally becoming unintelligible when sound effects or music was played on top, the localization team had to lower the volume of the music at some points, move the sound backwards or forwards slightly, or raise the volume of certain consonants; the largest such issue was the voice clip for the "Objection!" interjection, where the "b" consonant initially was drowned by the sound effect.

== Release ==
Dual Destinies was released for the Nintendo 3DS in Japan on July 25, 2013, and on October 24, 2013 in North America and Europe. In Japan, a limited edition was made available, which includes a Phoenix Wright figurine, a Nintendo 3DS pouch, and stickers. The American and European releases were only made available digitally, due to a lack of retail support for previous Ace Attorney games. According to Eshiro, the developers also wanted to reduce the delay between the Japanese and Western releases.

A version with high-resolution graphics was released for iOS on August 7, 2014 in Japan and on August 14, 2014 in North America and Europe. The first episode is available for free in this version, with remaining episodes being sold separately. An Android version was released in Japanese and English on May 23, 2017. It was also released on January 25, 2024 on Nintendo Switch, PlayStation 4, Windows and Xbox One, as part of the Apollo Justice: Ace Attorney Trilogy compilation, alongside Apollo Justice and the sequel Spirit of Justice.

The two additional episodes, "Turnabout Reclaimed" and "Quiz Turnabout Deduction", were made available as downloadable content shortly after the game's Japanese release. "Turnabout Reclaimed" was released in the West on November 21, 2013, but "Quiz Turnabout Deduction" remained exclusive to Japan due to its dependency on in-depth knowledge of Japanese culture. Downloadable costumes for Phoenix, Athena and Apollo were made available for download upon the game's release. These costumes were available for free until August 15, 2013 in Japan, and until November 7, 2013 for the English versions, after which they were available for purchase. The 2024 Trilogy compilation includes "Turnabout Reclaimed" and the DLC costumes.

A VR version is scheduled for release in 2027. Developed by AMATA Games, the port will be available on Meta's VR Glasses, Quest 2, Meta Quest Pro, Meta Quest 3 and Meta Quest 3S headsets.

== Reception ==
Reception

Aggregate score
Aggregator	Score
Metacritic	3DS: 81/100 iOS: 85/100

Review scores
Publication	Score
Destructoid	9.5/10
Famitsu	10/10, 9/10, 10/10, 8/10
Game Informer	8/10
GamesRadar+	4/5
IGN	7.2/10
TouchArcade	iOS: 4/5

Dual Destinies received "generally favorable reviews", according to the review aggregator Metacritic. It debuted at the top of the Japanese video game charts with 250,216 copies sold in its first week. According to Capcom, the projected sales of the game "were basically achieved".

Chuck Osborn at IGN enjoyed searching crime scenes for clues, but wished that the mood matrix and perceive systems could have been used on demand rather than at specific points only. Meanwhile, Reona Ebihara at Famitsu said that the mood matrix fits perfectly into the game and is fun to use. Chris Hoffman at GamesRadar said that the gameplay felt fulfilling, with victories feeling earned, but that there were a few instances of "debatable" logic. He liked the mood matrix, saying that it adds "some nice diversity" to the trials. He also enjoyed the perceive and psyche-lock systems, but found them underutilized.

Aerox at Destructoid said that the game inherits issues from previous Ace Attorney games, such as how evidence sometimes can only be presented when the game's script allows it, and how it sometimes is unclear how to trigger events during investigations; he did however note that these occur less frequently than in previous Ace Attorney games. Osborn criticized the cross-examinations, saying that objections that should logically be valid are sometimes not accepted by the game, and that the player often has to resort to trial and error. Meanwhile, Bryan Vore at Game Informer said that the in-game task list and new way of traveling made sure that he never felt lost during investigations, and knew what to do to proceed. Urara Honma at Famitsu also noted the hints and lower difficulty as helpful features.

Honma commented on the twist in the game's ending, calling it shocking, and saying that Dual Destinies was the best in the series. Rolling Uchizawa at Famitsu thought that some scenes during trials felt forced, but that the back-and-forth dialog is effective at creating tension. Aerox called the game "an extremely strong addition to the series", saying that the cohesiveness of the themes and narrative made the game's episodes more connected than those in previous Ace Attorney games, and that he liked how the game discusses subjects such as declining trust in the legal system, the definition of justice, and people considering winning more important than the truth. Vore said that the game's last two episodes had him "glued to the screen", but that he was tired of the series' reuse of the same story structure, with early cases having small connections to a bigger case, which in turn has a connection to a mystery from the past.

Critics enjoyed the game's visuals: Osborn said that it was the best-looking game in the series, and that the 3D effect worked well; Ebihara described the animations as exciting to watch and smoother than those in previous Ace Attorney games; and Honma said that the 3D characters felt more "alive and charming" than the 2D characters in previous Ace Attorney games. Honma, Ebihara and Hoffman thought the character visuals retained their image and comical aspects from the 2D games, something Honma called "incredible". Vore said that the new 3D environments made the crime scenes feel like real places rather than "interactive paintings". Aerox called the 3D animation beautiful, and liked the cutscenes and soundtrack.

In addition, the English localization was criticized for the abundance of typos and spelling mistakes.

=== Accolades ===
The game was awarded 2013's Best 3DS Adventure Game by IGN. Gamezebo included it on a non-ranked list of the twenty-five best iOS games of 2014. Digital Spy gave it a Game of the Year award for most memorable moment, for the game's third episode, "Turnabout Academy", citing the narrative use of the friendship between the characters Juniper, Robin and Hugh. It was also nominated for Destructoid's "Best of 2013 Portable Game" award, and was the runner-up for VGMO's award for the best Eastern soundtrack of 2013. The downloadable episode Turnabout Reclaimed won Hardcore Gamer's award for the best downloadable content of 2013.
