= Lakewood Louie =

American poker player

George Shaw

World Series of Poker
- Bracelets: 4
- Money finishes: 4
- Highest WSOP Main Event finish: None

George "Lakewood Louie" Shaw (January 1, 1915 – December 14, 1982) was an American poker player best known for his success at the World Series of Poker (WSOP) in the late 1970s and early 1980s.

Louie won his first WSOP bracelet in the 1978 $5,000 Draw High event, winning $21,000. In 1979, he won two bracelets, one in $1,000 Ace to Five Draw and one in $2,000 Draw High. Louie won his fourth bracelet in 1980 in the $1,000 Razz event. His total tournament winnings at the World Series of Poker exceed $100,000.

== World Series of Poker bracelets ==
Year	Tournament	Prize (US$)
1978	$5,000 Draw High	$21,000
1979	$2,000 Draw High	$22,800
1979	$1,000 Ace to Five Draw	$22,200
1980	$1,000 Razz	$33,600
