= Terry King =

American poker player

World Series of Poker
- Bracelet: 1
- Money finishes: 5
- Highest WSOP Main Event finish: None

Terry King is a World Series of Poker champion in the 1978 $200 Ladies - Limit 7 Card Stud event.

Her total live tournament winnings exceed $45,000. All of her live cashes have came in 7 Card Stud events over 25 years of playing.

== World Series of Poker bracelets ==
Year	Tournament	Prize (US$)
1978	$200 Ladies - Limit 7 Card Stud	$10,080
