= Phoenix Wright: Ace Attorney – Spirit of Justice =

2016 video game

- Nintendo 3DS Japanese cover art depicting (left to right) Phoenix Wright, Maya Fey, Apollo Justice, and Nahyuta Sahdmadhi
- Developer: Capcom
- Publisher: Capcom
- Directors: Takeshi Yamazaki; Takuro Fuse
- Producer: Motohide Eshiro
- Designer: Yoriki Daigo
- Artist: Takuro Fuse
- Writers: Takeshi Yamazaki; Hironao Fukuda; Kōki Fuse; Masakazu Eguchi
- Composers: Noriyuki Iwadare; Toshihiko Horiyama; Masami Onodera
- Series: Ace Attorney
- Engine: MT Framework Mobile; RE Engine (Apollo Justice Trilogy)
- Platforms: Nintendo 3DS, iOS, Android
- Release: Nintendo 3DS: JP: June 9, 2016; WW: September 8, 2016; iOS, Android: WW: September 21, 2017
- Genres: Adventure, visual novel
- Mode: Single-player

Phoenix Wright: Ace Attorney – Spirit of Justice (Note: Known in Japan as Gyakuten Saiban 6 (逆転裁判6; lit. "Turnabout Trial 6")) is a visual novel adventure video game developed and published by Capcom, and the sixth main entry (and ninth overall installment) in the Ace Attorney series. The game was released for Nintendo 3DS in Japan in June 2016, and in North America and Europe in September that year. Versions for iOS and Android followed a year later in September 2017, and it was released for Nintendo Switch, PlayStation 4, Windows, and Xbox One in January 2024 as part of the Apollo Justice: Ace Attorney Trilogy compilation.

The game primarily follows Phoenix Wright as he travels to the fictitious Kingdom of Khura'in to see Maya Fey, only to come into conflict with the country's court system, where defense attorneys have been deemed unnecessary and verdicts are decided based on a mystical vision called the "Divination Séance". Meanwhile, Phoenix's subordinates, Apollo Justice and Athena Cykes, take on cases at the Wright Anything Agency in his absence.

== Gameplay ==
Spirit of Justice continues the investigation and courtroom gameplay of its predecessors, in which players take the role of the defense attorneys Phoenix Wright, Apollo Justice, and Athena Cykes, and try to defend their clients. Like previous games in the franchise, chapters are divided into two types of gameplay: investigations, where players gather information from people and search for evidence, and trials, where they must use evidence to find contradictions in witness testimonies. Investigations utilize the 3D navigation introduced in Phoenix Wright: Ace Attorney – Dual Destinies, allowing players to navigate environments from various angles. Along with returning gameplay elements, such as Psyche-Locks, Perceiving, and the Mood Matrix, the game introduces Divination Séances, which show the final moments of a victim before their death. By paying close attention to the senses that appear in the séances, players must find contradictions in the insights given about them.

== Plot ==
=== Setting and characters ===
The story of Spirit of Justice is set roughly one year after its predecessor, Dual Destinies, and once again focuses on defense attorney Phoenix Wright and his two understudies Apollo Justice and Athena Cykes. While previous games in the series have been set in Los Angeles, California (Japan in the original Japanese releases), Spirit of Justice sees Phoenix travel to the fictional kingdom of Khura'in, a deeply religious nation where the art of spirit channeling originates. Roughly half the game's episodes detail Phoenix's activities in Khura'in, while the other half follow Apollo and Athena, who are left to watch over the Wright Anything Agency in Phoenix's absence. The game features the reintroduction of Maya Fey, a spirit medium and Phoenix's longtime friend and former assistant, who has not appeared in the main series in person since Trials and Tribulations. Other returning characters include Trucy Wright, a magician and Phoenix's adopted daughter; Ema Skye, a former detective who has recently become a forensic investigator; Simon Blackquill, a prosecutor and former prison inmate who is friends with Athena; Pearl Fey, Maya's younger cousin and fellow spirit medium; and Miles Edgeworth, the district chief prosecutor and Phoenix's friend and rival. New to the series are Rayfa Padma Khura'in, the princess and royal priestess of Khura'in, and Nahyuta Sahdmadhi, an international prosecutor and devout Khura'inese monk.

=== Story ===
Phoenix travels to Khura'in to visit Maya, who is finishing her ascetic training needed to perfect her channeling abilities and become master of Kurain Village. Upon arriving, Phoenix's tour guide Ahlbi Ur'gaid is accused of stealing the Founder's Orb relic and murdering a security guard. During Ahlbi's trial, Phoenix discovers that Khura'in is intensely prejudiced against defense attorneys. Under the Defense Culpability Act, a law enacted 23 years prior, anyone who defends or aids a guilty criminal will be given the same sentence. With the addition of the Divination Séance showing the deceased's last moments, all trials in Khura'in since have led to guilty verdicts, with most defense attorneys having been executed. Despite this, Phoenix successfully defends Ahlbi, exposing head monk Pees'lubn Andistan'dhin as the real killer, earning Khura'in's first "not guilty" verdict since the Act's introduction. He also learns of the Defiant Dragons, a rebel group fighting against the current legal system.

In America, Apollo and Athena defend Trucy against prosecutor Nahyuta Sahdmadhi when she is accused of murdering performer Manov Mistree, AKA "The Great Mr. Reus," during her stage show. They prove the real killer to be the actual Mr. Reus, TV Producer Roger Retinz. After reuniting with Maya, Phoenix must defend her when she is charged with murdering high priest Tahrust Inmee, who actually committed suicide to protect his wife Beh'leeb after she accidentally killed one of their disciples to manipulate his Divination Séance. During the case, Phoenix learns that the Defiant Dragons' leader, Dhurke Sahdmadhi, is Nahyuta's father and Apollo's foster father. Meanwhile, Athena defends soba shop owner Bucky Whet, accused of murdering rakugo performer Taifu Toneido. Athena exposes Taifu's co-star Geiru as the true murderer.

Days later, Apollo is approached by Dhurke, who asks for help locating the stolen Founder's Orb. After battling Phoenix himself in court over the orb's ownership, Apollo learns that Maya has been taken hostage to force Phoenix to win the orb for his client. Upon proving Dhurke's ownership, the group return to Khura'in where Justice Minister Inga Karkhuul Khura'in, husband of Queen Ga'ran Sigatar Khura'in, is holding Maya hostage. When Dhurke goes to make a hostage exchange, he is accused of murdering Inga after he is found dead. With Ga'ran acting as prosecutor, Phoenix and Apollo must prove Dhurke innocent of both Inga's murder and the assassination of the previous queen, Ga'ran's sister Amara, which led to the DC Act's creation. Along with learning that Amara is alive, Apollo discovers that Dhurke was already killed by Inga a few days earlier, having been channeled by Maya to see Apollo one last time. Apollo also discovers that Nahyuta had been blackmailed by Ga'ran in order to protect Rayfa, revealed to be Nahyuta's sister and Dhurke and Amara's biological daughter.

With the ties of her father's crime threatening to destroy Rayfa's life, Apollo uses his final gift from Dhurke, a photo of his deceased biological father, Jove, to conduct a Divination Séance, proving that both Jove and Inga's murders and Amara's attempted assassination were committed by Ga'ran. As Ga'ran threatens to use her royal authority to execute Apollo and Phoenix, Apollo proves that Ga'ran possesses no spiritual powers, and thus has no claim to the throne, nullifying all the laws she had passed and ending her rule. As Rayfa is chosen to succeed her as queen, Apollo decides to stay in Khura'in to establish his own practice and help Nahyuta rebuild Khura'in's legal system. In a post-credits sequence, Phoenix gives Jove's photo to Apollo's mother, who decides it is time to tell her children the truth.

An additional case set after the game's events features Phoenix defending Ellen Wyatt, who claims she was attacked just after her wedding, but traveled back in time and is now accused of killing her attacker, Dumas Gloomsbury. Meanwhile, Phoenix's childhood friend Larry Butz returns, claiming he is Ellen's fiancé. Phoenix discovers that there was no time travel – the wedding guests secretly held the wedding reception twice – and that the culprit is family butler Pierce Nichody, who killed Gloomsbury and framed Ellen as revenge against the groom Sorin Sprocket for an incident the previous year that took the life of Sorin's sister and Pierce's fiancée.

== Development ==
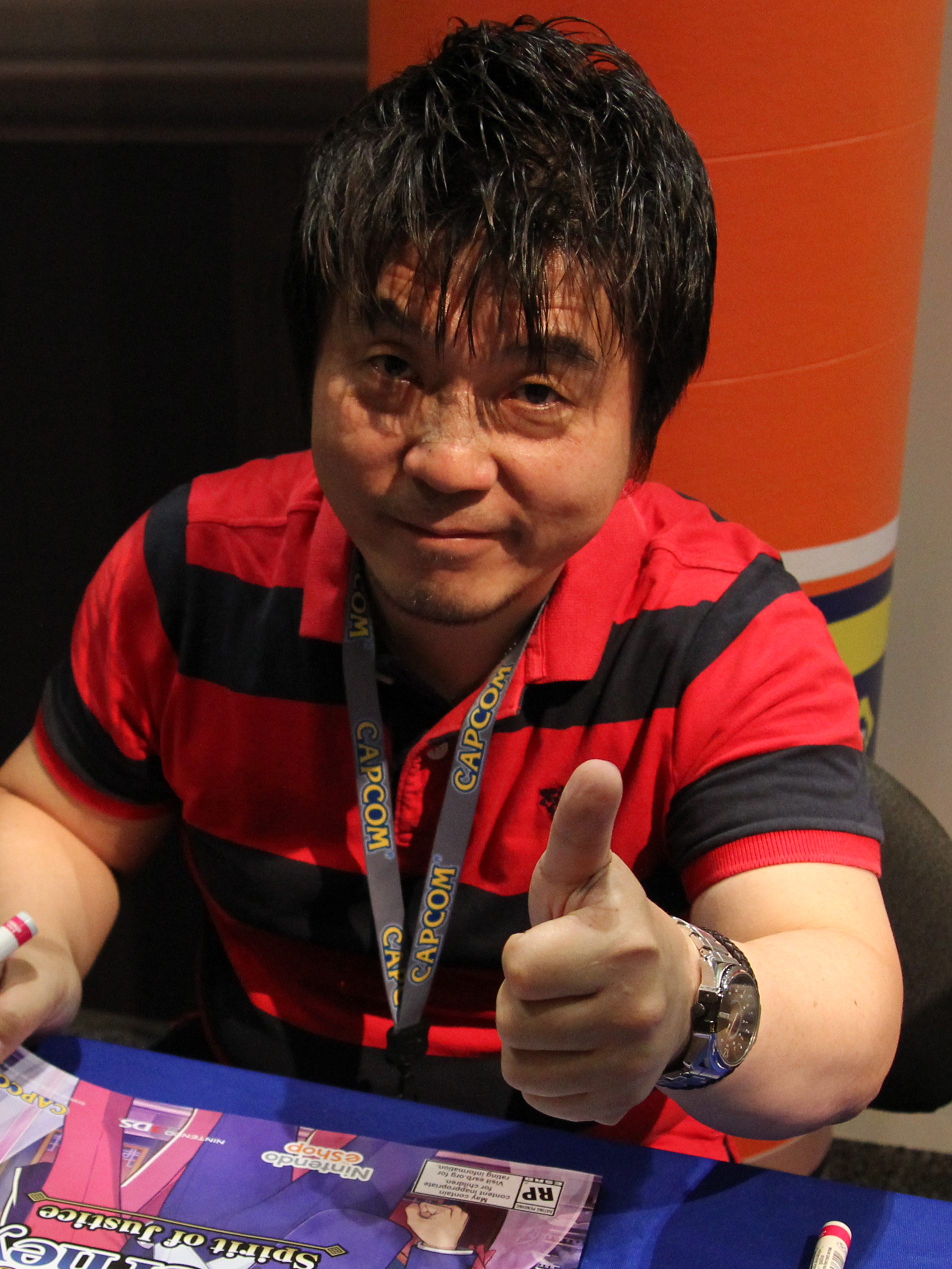
The game was produced by Motohide Eshiro.

Spirit of Justice was produced by Motohide Eshiro and co-directed by Takeshi Yamazaki and Takuro Fuse; Yamazaki was in charge of the game's scenario, while Fuse directed the graphics and gameplay and was the game's art director. The game's music was composed principally by Noriyuki Iwadare, with additional tracks by Toshihiko Horiyama, who had previously composed the soundtrack for Apollo Justice: Ace Attorney, and series newcomer Masami Onodera. Capcom mentioned the game for the first time in December 2013, at which point they had just begun working "full force" on a new game in the series and were thinking up ideas for it. When they announced the game for Japan and the West in September 2015, development was 30% finished. By the end of 2015, development was mostly finished, with the team working on polishing and adding finishing touches.

When developing the previous game in the series, Dual Destinies, Yamazaki had been the only director; after finishing its development, he had become exhausted and wanted to quit working on Ace Attorney. Eshiro had encouraged him to continue by taking him to a press conference in Taiwan and to San Diego Comic-Con to meet the media and fans of the series; following this, Yamazaki felt renewed enthusiasm over the series, and wanted to work on a sixth Ace Attorney. Thinking Yamazaki's exhaustion stemmed from too much directing responsibility, Eshiro decided to split directing responsibilities between Yamazaki and Fuse; he had at first considered having two equal directors working on the game, but decided against it out of fear that the development team would have difficulty with dealing with contradicting opinions from two directors working on the same aspects of the game.

The implementation of the new divination séance gameplay system was similar to that of the Mind Chess system in Ace Attorney Investigations 2: Prosecutor's Gambit. It was created to show the events of a crime from the victim's point of view, and to have that character's feelings be potentially important evidence. Initially, the developers had considered using ghosts or puppet possession for this, but they were rejected due to being too creepy and "out there". The divination séance system was tweaked with improved hints in response to feedback from the Spirit of Justice demo at the Tokyo Game Show, where it was seen as being too difficult and taking too long to play. Other gameplay features being affected by fan feedback include the return of features from Dual Destinies that had been well-received, such as the backlog; adjustments to the difficulty, which had been perceived as low in Dual Destinies; and the hint system being possible to turn off. According to Eshiro and Yamazaki, character actions and movements were given a larger focus than in Dual Destinies, with Rayfa's dancing animation given as an example of this. Returning characters from Dual Destinies were given new 3D models to make sure that the quality was higher and consistent with those of new characters. Like the previous title, Spirit of Justice features fully voiced anime cutscenes, this time animated by A-1 Pictures, who also produced the Ace Attorney anime series.

=== Writing ===
Yamazaki led a team of scenario writers, who worked to come up with an overall theme and setting for the game, aiming to come up with ideas that feel new and surprising, but that still build upon previous Ace Attorney games. They did this through brainstorming, where no one was allowed to shoot down others' ideas, and also analyzed all previous games in the series to determine what defines the series and what makes it fun. They came up with the theme of "courtroom revolution"; Yamazaki described it as meaning "the oppressed and weak defeating the strong", saying that it also is a kind of turnabout. After this, they decided on each individual episode's overall story; Yamazaki decided on the general direction, after which adjustments and additions were done through discussions with other writers. There was one writer in charge of each episode, who each discussed and solidified the ideas for their episode with Yamazaki.

According to Yamazaki, they focused more on the game's world than in previous games in the series. The decision to do this came from how, throughout the series, Phoenix has been in "a place that lacks enemies", and from difficulties with developing the series further within the Japanese courtroom setting. Based on fan feedback, the development team gave Apollo Justice a larger presence than in Dual Destinies: they felt that Phoenix had been portrayed as the main character in Dual Destinies, with Apollo just being an important part of the plot, so they set Spirit of Justice in two different countries with one equal main character in each location. The character Rayfa was described by Yamazaki and Eshiro as a heroine, but also as an opponent to Phoenix; they thought that this approach, as opposed to having the heroine stand by the hero's side, brought something new and fresh to the series.

The episode plans were reviewed and discussed thoroughly by the team; the discussions took a long time, with the staff often staying in the meeting room until late at night. Each episode's main writer then wrote their episode; as the writers had different strengths, such as dialogue, mystery or comedy, the episodes were then discussed further, with changes done in response to feedback from the staff on the team. After the scenarios were finalized, visuals, music and sound effects were decided upon.

== Release ==
The game was released in Japan on June 9, 2016, and digitally through the Nintendo eShop in North America and Europe on September 8, 2016. Japanese first print copies of the game include two short, out-of-continuity bonus episodes featuring Phoenix and Apollo, along with three downloadable costumes. This content was later released in English markets; the costume set was released alongside the game and was free for the first week, while the first and second bonus episodes were released on September 15, 2016 and September 22, 2016 under the name "Asinine Attorney", each one packaged with an additional 3DS menu theme. A limited edition containing a drama CD, a plush toy, a tote bag, and a visual poster card book, was also made available in Japan. A second costume set, based on Capcom's Sengoku Basara series, was released in Japan on June 23. An additional episode, "Turnabout Time Traveler" (時を越える逆転; "Turnabout Across Time"), was released as downloadable content on June 30, 2016 in Japan, and was free to download until July 20, 2016; the episode was released in English on September 29, 2016.

The game was later ported with high-resolution graphics to mobile platforms, receiving a worldwide release for iOS and Android systems on September 21, 2017. The mobile releases allow for cases to be purchased individually or in a complete pack; the first costume set and "Turnabout Time Traveler" case were also released as downloadable content for the mobile versions. It was also released on January 25, 2024 on Nintendo Switch, PlayStation 4, Windows and Xbox One, as part of the Apollo Justice: Ace Attorney Trilogy compilation, alongside the previous games Apollo Justice and Dual Destinies, and includes "Turnabout Time Traveler" and the first DLC costume set.

== Reception ==
Reception

Aggregate score
| Aggregator | Score |
|---|---|
| Metacritic | 81/100 |

Review scores
| Publication | Score |
|---|---|
| Destructoid | 9/10 |
| Famitsu | 8/10, 9/10, 9/10, 8/10 |
| Game Informer | 8.5/10 |
| GameSpot | 8/10 |
| Hardcore Gamer | 4/5 |
| IGN | 6.5/10 |
| Nintendo Life | 8.4/10 |
| Polygon | 7.5/10 |
| The Escapist | 3.5/5 |
| TouchArcade | 4.5/5 |

Spirit of Justice received generally favorable reviews, according to the review aggregator Metacritic. It was the top selling video game in Japan during its debut week, with 196,831 copies sold. It dropped to second place during its second week, with an additional 25,288 copies sold, to sixth place in its third week, with 11,803 copies sold, and to tenth place in its fourth, with 7,543 copies sold. The sales matched Capcom's expectations for the game.

Four reviewers at Famitsu (Yoshida, Ashida, Honma, and Uchisawa) did a joint cross-review of the game. Ashida and Honma said that they liked how everything comes together in the game's ending; Honma also liked seeing how characters such as Maya had grown up and changed, to the point of investigating everything just to see more dialogue. Uchisawa thought that some plot developments were too "out there", and Ashida noted that the game's occult feeling might be divisive. Ashida found the divination séance system to be a fresh addition to the gameplay, but also felt that it was "stretching it"; Uchisawa disagreed, finding the game to not feel fresh, but still thought that the game was fun.

IGN's Tristan Ogilvie also found the game to not bring anything new to the series, and criticized the Divination Seances, calling them "wishy-washy, and less far intuitive [sic] from the more logical cross-examination approaches". He also lamented the investigation sections, calling them "merely point-and-click pixel hunts", and wished the gameplay featured more forensic analysis sections. He praised the over-the-top characters and engaging courtroom sequences, though, and the visual quality of the game.
