= Perry Green (poker player) =

American poker player (born 1936)

- Nickname: Alaska's Poker Guru

World Series of Poker
- Bracelets: 3
- Money finishes: 30
- Highest WSOP Main Event finish: 2nd, 1981

World Poker Tour
- Title: None
- Final table: 1
- Money finish: 1

Perry Green (March 17, 1936) is an American poker player who has won three World Series of Poker bracelets and who has made it to the final table of the World Series of Poker Main Event twice.

Green, a fur trader from Anchorage, Alaska, began playing at the World Series of Poker (WSOP) in the 1970s and won his first bracelet in 1976 in the $1,000 Ace to Five Draw event. In the following year, he won his second bracelet in the $500 Ace to Five event, then in 1979 won a third WSOP bracelet, in the $1,500 No Limit Texas hold'em event in which he defeated Jim Bechtel during heads-up play.

In addition to his three bracelets, Green's largest payday to date in a poker tournament was at the 1981 World Series of Poker Main Event where he finished in second place, earning $150,000, after he had been beaten by the reigning champion, Stu Ungar in heads-up play. At the 1991 World Series of Poker Main Event, he made a second final table, finishing fifth.

Green has been active in the Alaska Jewish community and in a so far unsuccessful effort to legalize casino poker in Alaska.

As of 2019, his total live tournament winnings exceed $1,124,000. His 23 cashes at the WSOP account for $592,709 of those winnings.

== WSOP Bracelets ==
Year	Tournament	Prize (US$)
1976	$1,000 Ace to Five Draw	$68,300
1977	$5,000 Ace to Five draw	$10,000
1979	$1,500 No Limit Texas Hold'em	$76,500
