= Mike Caro =

American poker player and casino executive

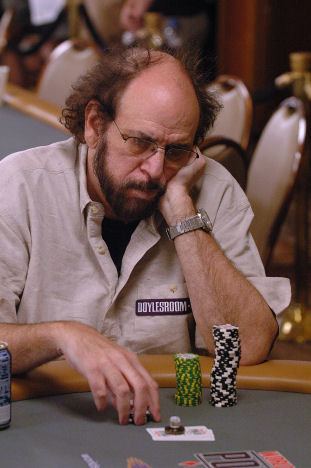
- Caro in the 2006 World Series of Poker
- Nickname: The Mad Genius
- Born: May 16, 1944 (age 82); Joplin, Missouri, U.S.

World Series of Poker
- Bracelet: None
- Money finishes: 7
- Highest WSOP Main Event finish: None

World Poker Tour
- Title: None
- Final table: None
- Money finish: 1

Mike A. Caro (born May 16, 1944) is an American professional poker player, pioneer poker theorist, author of poker books, and casino executive.

== Author ==
In 1978 Caro contributed 50 statistical tables to Doyle Brunson's Super/System and wrote that book's chapter on draw poker. He acts as a consultant to many casinos, providing odds, and he helped develop the Poker Probe, the first serious commercial PC program for analyzing poker situations. He is the founder of the Mike Caro University of Poker, Gaming and Life Strategy, the world's first permanent poker school. He was an early predictor that real money online poker would work.

Caro is the author of a number of books about poker, including:

- The Body Language of Poker
- Bobby Baldwin's Winning Poker Secrets
- Caro on Gambling – a collection of his columns published in Gambling Times magazine
- Mike Caro's Book of Poker Tells – There is also a companion Video/DVD
- Caro's Fundamental Secrets of Winning Poker
- Gambling Times Official Rules of Poker
- Gambling Times Quiz Book
- Master Hold'em and Omaha Poker
- New Poker Games – Descriptions and rules of esoteric or newly invented poker variants
- Odds Quick and Simple
- Professional Hold'em Play by Play
- Poker at the Millennium by Mike Caro & Mike Cappelletti
- Poker for Women: A Course in Destroying Male Opponents at Poker and Beyond
- Caro’s Most Profitable Hold’em Advice

He also has made multiple videos, some of which correspond to his books. He was formerly editor-in-chief of Poker Player magazine and senior editor of Gambling Times magazine.

Mike Caro coined the famous poker tells "Weak means Strong" and "Strong means Weak", meaning that players will try to fool other players by acting the opposite way of the true strength of their poker hand.

In 1984 at the World Series of Poker he demonstrated Orac (Caro backwards), a poker-playing computer program that he had written. Orac was the world's first serious attempt at an AI poker player, and most poker professionals were surprised at how well it played.

== Casino executive and poker player ==
Caro was the chief strategist for the Bicycle Casino when it opened in 1984 and was named the general manager of the Huntington Park Casino in 1986. In 1992 he helped organize the "World Poker Finals" at Foxwoods Resort Casino, the first corporate sponsored tournament.

He is also a persistent advocate for four-color decks in card rooms and tournaments. As of 2009, his total career live tournament winnings exceed $175,000.

His wife, Phyllis, is director of poker operations at Hollywood Park Casino.
