= Jesse Alto =

American poker player (1927–1998)

Jesse Michael Alto
- Nickname: 'The Cat'
- Born: January 1, 1927
- Died: May 3, 1998 (aged 71)

World Series of Poker
- Bracelet: None
- Final tables: 7
- Money finishes: 8
- Highest WSOP Main Event finish: 2nd, 1976

Jesse Michael Alto (January 1, 1927 – May 3, 1998), was an American poker player, best known for his numerous main event final table appearances at the World Series of Poker (WSOP).

Alto was a fixture at the World Series of Poker in the 1970s and 1980s. Although he never won any WSOP bracelets, he cashed in many events, most notably in the Main Event.

Alto was one of the final five players at the 1974 final table finishing either fourth or fifth according to New York Times magazine story from July 28, 1974.

Alto's highest Main Event finish was in 1976 where he finished as the runner-up to Doyle Brunson. In the final hand of the 1976 WSOP Alto held A♣ J♥ while Brunson held 10♠ 2♠. The flop came A♥ J♠ 10♥ giving two pairs for Alto and one pair for Brunson. Alto then led out with a pot size bet, Brunson with the chip lead countered by moving all-in, which was called. The turn came 2♣, giving Brunson two pair but still trailing, the river brought 10♦ giving Brunson a full house and the win. This was Alto's highest finish in the WSOP main event, but his highest main event money finish was 3rd place in 1984, because the main event had a winner-take-all format until 1978.

Alto made the WSOP Main Event final table 7 times: 1974, 1975, 1976, 1978, 1984, 1985 and 1986. He made his final Main Event cash in 1988, finishing ninth.

Alto's total live tournament winnings exceeded $430,000
