= 1978 World Series of Poker =

Series of poker tournaments

- Location: Binion's Horseshoe, Las Vegas, Nevada
- Dates: May 7 – 17

Champion
- (United States) Bobby Baldwin

The 1978 World Series of Poker (WSOP) was a series of poker tournaments held in May 1978 at Binion's Horseshoe. Its Main Event was the first to not have a winner-take-all prize. Instead the tournament had a progressive prize structure, with 50 percent for the winner, then 20% for second, 15% for third, 10% for fourth, and 5% for fifth place.

== Events ==
There were ten preliminary events at the 1978 World Series of Poker. Future Poker Hall of Famer Chip Reese won his first WSOP bracelet in the 1978 WSOP.

#	Date	Event	Entries	Winner	Prize	Runner-up	Results
1	May 7, 1978	$10,000 No Limit Deuce to Seven Draw	15	Billy Baxter (1/2)	$90,000	Byron Wolford	Results
2	May 8, 1978	$1,000 Limit Razz	32	Gary Berland (1/2)	$19,200	David Singer	Results
3	May 9, 1978	$500 Limit Seven-card stud	57	Gary Berland (2/3)	$17,100	Neil Einfeld	Results
4	May 10, 1978	$5,000 Limit Seven Card Stud	23	Doyle Brunson (1/5)	$68,000	Bobby Baldwin (0/2)	Results
5	May 11, 1978	$1,000 No Limit Hold'em	71	Aubrey Day (1/2)	$42,600	Unknown	Results
6	May 12, 1978	$200 Ladies' Limit Seven Card Stud	84	Terry King (1/2)	$10,080	Starla Brodie	Results
7	May 13, 1978	$5,000 Limit Draw High	7	Lakewood Louie (1/1)	$21,000	Rick Greider	Results
8	May 14, 1978	$1,500 No Limit Hold'em	52	Hans Lund (1/1)	$46,800	Curtiss Skinner	Results
9	May 15, 1978	$1,000 Limit Seven Card Stud Split	32	Chip Reese (1/1)	$19,200	Jerry Pruitt	Results
10	May 16, 1978	$1,000 Limit Ace to Five Draw	32	Henry Young (1/1)	$19,200	Gary Berland (0/3)	Results
11	May 17, 1978	$10,000 No Limit Hold'em Main Event	42	Bobby Baldwin (1/3)	$210,000	Crandell Addington	Results

== Main Event ==
There were 42 entrants to the main event. Each paid $10,000 to enter the tournament. The 1978 Main Event was the first edition of the tournament to pay prize money to any players other than the winner. Bobby Baldwin received half of the total prize pool for his win. Crandell Addington finished runner-up in the Main Event, which he did in the 1974 WSOP Main Event.

=== Final table ===
Place	Name	Prize
1st	Bobby Baldwin	$210,000
2nd	Crandell Addington	$84,000
3rd	Louis Hunsucker	$63,000
4th	Buck Buchanan	$42,000
5th	Jesse Alto	$21,000
6th	Ken Smith	None

=== Performance of past champions ===
- Day one: Johnny Moss, Thomas "Amarillo Slim" Preston, Walter "Puggy" Pearson, Brian "Sailor" Roberts, Doyle Brunson

=== Other notable players ===
- Gabe Kaplan and Barbara Freer (the first woman player).
