= Apollo Justice: Ace Attorney Trilogy =

2024 compilation video game

- Cover art featuring the game's main characters
- Developer: Capcom
- Publisher: Capcom
- Director: Takashi Sado (Note: Original games directed by: Mitsuru Endo (Apollo Justice); Takeshi Yamazaki (Dual Destinies, Spirit of Justice); Yasuhiro Seto (Dual Destinies); Takuro Fuse (Spirit of Justice))
- Producer: Kenichi Hashimoto
- Series: Ace Attorney
- Engine: RE Engine
- Platforms: Nintendo Switch; PlayStation 4; Windows; Xbox One
- Release: January 25, 2024
- Genres: Adventure, visual novel
- Mode: Single-player

Apollo Justice: Ace Attorney Trilogy (Note: Known in Japan as Gyakuten Saiban 456: Odoroki Selection (逆転裁判456王泥喜セレクション; "Turnabout Trial 456: Odoroki Selection")) is a 2024 video game compilation developed and published by Capcom. It is a sequel to Phoenix Wright: Ace Attorney Trilogy and consists of remasters of the fourth through sixth main installments in the Ace Attorney series: Apollo Justice: Ace Attorney (2007), Phoenix Wright: Ace Attorney – Dual Destinies (2013), and Phoenix Wright: Ace Attorney – Spirit of Justice (2016). The compilation was released on January 25, 2024 for Nintendo Switch, PlayStation 4, Windows, and Xbox One.

== Development and release ==
Development for Apollo Justice: Ace Attorney Trilogy began in 2021. The development team aimed to create a gameplay experience for both newcomers and longtime fans. All three included games were ported to run on RE Engine.

On June 12, 2023, Capcom announced the compilation for a planned 2024 release. The compilation features an updated UI, high-resolution artwork, and localization in seven languages. As in The Great Ace Attorney Chronicles, a "Story Mode" setting automatically solves puzzles and advances through the plot without requiring player input. The compilation includes all internationally-released downloadable content for Dual Destinies and Spirit of Justice. Bonus features include galleries for viewing artwork and listening to music, and an "animation studio", which allows players to combine different character animations and backgrounds from each game. The game also has several "accolades", that are obtained through actions such as investigating items in certain cases, clearing episodes, or choosing certain options.

== Reception ==
Reception

Aggregate scores
Aggregator	Score
Metacritic	(NS) 84/100 (PC) 75/100 (PS4) 81/100 (XONE) 83/100
OpenCritic	90% recommend

Review scores
Publication	Score
Game Informer	8.5/10
Hardcore Gamer	4.5/5
Nintendo Life	9/10
VG247	4/5

Apollo Justice: Ace Attorney Trilogy received "generally favorable" according to review aggregator website Metacritic. 90% of critics recommended the game according to OpenCritic.
