= 1977 World Series of Poker =

Series of poker tournaments

- Location: Binion's Horseshoe, Las Vegas, Nevada
- Dates: April 28 – May 10

Champion
- (United States) Doyle Brunson

The 1977 World Series of Poker (WSOP) was a series of poker tournaments held at Binion's Horseshoe from April 28 to May 10, 1977.

== Events ==
The 1977 WSOP featured 12 preliminary events. The 1977 WSOP featured the first Ladies' Championship event. Doyle Brunson recorded consecutive years recording multiple bracelet wins.

#	Date	Event	Entries	Winner	Prize	Runner-up	Results
1	April 28, 1977	$5,000 Ace to Five Draw Lowball	36	Billy Allen (1/1)	$10,800	Vic Resnick	Results
2	April 29, 1977	$10,000 Deuce to Seven Draw	11	Bobby Baldwin (1/1)	$80,000	Billy Baxter (0/1)	Results
3	April 30, 1977	$5,000 Seven Card Stud (Rebuy)	11	Bobby Baldwin (1/2)	$44,000	Ralph Levitt	Results
4	May 1, 1977	$500 Limit Razz	21	Gary Berland (1/1)	$6,300	Chip Reese	Results
5	May 2, 1977	$10,000 Seven Card Stud Split	7	Doyle Brunson (1/3)	$52,500	David Sklansky	Results
6	May 3, 1977	$5000 Ace to Five Draw	2	Perry Green (1/2)	$10,000	Unknown	Results
7	May 4, 1977	$1,000 No Limit Hold'em	55	George Huber (1/1)	$33,000	Milton Butts	Results
8	May 5, 1977	$1,500 No-Limit Hold'em	38	Louis Sager Hunsucker Jr. (1/1)	$34,200	Wayne Bingham	Results
9	May 6, 1977	$100 Ladies' Seven Card Stud	93	Jackie McDaniels (1/1)	$5,580	Linda Davis	Results
10	May 7, 1977	$1,000 7 Card Stud Split	18	Fats Morgan (1/1)	$10,800	Dave Levine	Results
11	May 8, 1977	$500 Seven Card Stud	38	Jeff Sandow (1/1)	$11,400	Roger Moore	Results
12	May 9, 1977	$5,000 Limit Razz	5	Richard Schwartz (1/1)	$25,000	Unknown	Results
13	May 10, 1977	$10,000 No Limit Hold'em Main Event	34	Doyle Brunson (2/4)	$340,000	Gary Berland (0/1)	Results

== Main Event ==
There were 34 entrants to the Main Event. Each paid $10,000 to enter the winner-take-all tournament. Brunson joined Johnny Moss as the only two-time winners of the Main Event at the time. Brunson once again won the Main Event with the same hole cards as the previous year, the 10–2.

=== Final table ===
Place	Name	Prize
1st	Doyle Brunson	$340,000
2nd	Gary Berland	None
3rd	Milo Jacobson	None
4th	Andy Moore	None
5th	Sailor Roberts	None
6th	Unknown	None
