= Louis Sager Hunsucker Jr. =

American poker player (1934–2021)

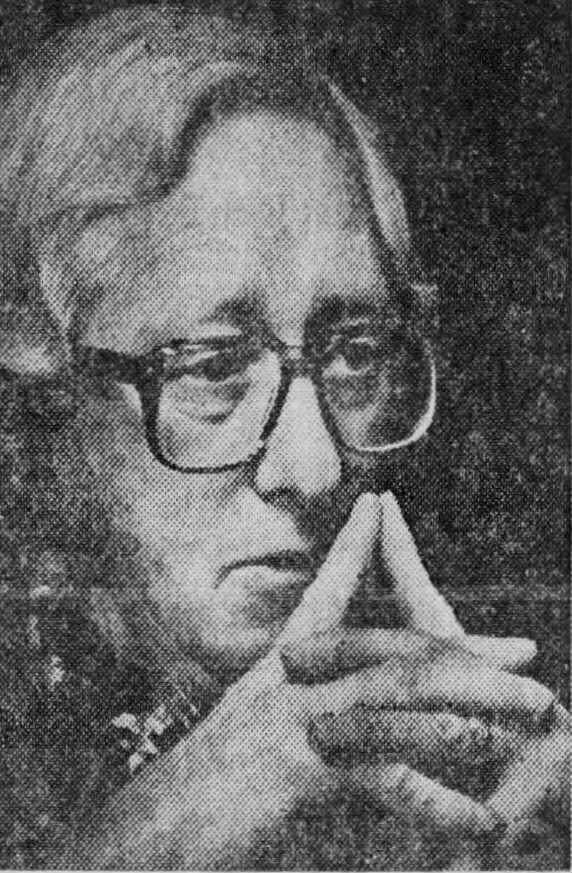
- Hunsucker in 1978
- Born: February 22, 1934; Harris, Texas, U.S.
- Died: April 27, 2021 (aged 87); Houston, Texas, U.S.

World Series of Poker
- Bracelet: 1
- Money finishes: 6
- Highest WSOP Main Event finish: 3rd, 1978

Louis Sager Hunsucker Jr. (February 22, 1934 – April 27, 2021), also known as Sager, The Big Book and The Main Book, was an American poker player.

== Life and career ==
Hunsucker was born in Harris, Texas, the son of Louis Sager Hunsucker Sr. and Pauline Edwina Tomlinson. He attended the University of Texas at Austin, graduating in 1959. After graduating, he worked as a businessman.

At the 1977 World Series of Poker, Hunsucker won a WSOP bracelet in the $1,500 No-Limit Hold’em event for $34,200.

In 1982, Hunsucker pleaded guilty to one count of tax evasion, and was placed on probation until 1984. After his probation sentence, in 1987, he was charged with promoting gambling, and was placed on probation again for three years.

== Death ==
Hunsucker died on April 27, 2021, in Houston, Texas, at the age of 87.
