= Tell (poker) =

Change in poker player behaviour or demeanour when assessing their hand

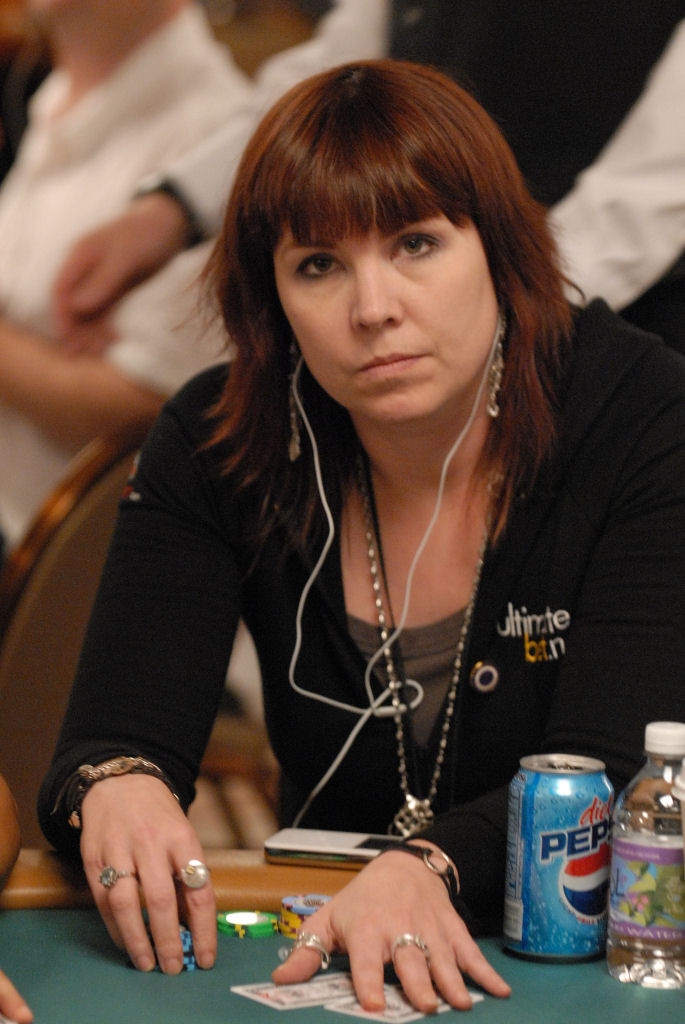
Professional poker player Annie Duke. Eye contact may be a sign that a player is trying to disguise a weak hand.

A tell in poker is a change in a player's behavior or demeanor that is claimed by some to give clues to that player's assessment of their hand. A player gains an advantage if they observe and understand the meaning of another player's tell, particularly if the tell is unconscious and reliable. Sometimes a player may fake a tell, hoping to induce their opponents to make poor judgments in response to the false tell. More often, people try to avoid giving out a tell, by maintaining a poker face regardless of how strong or weak their hand is.

== Examples ==
A tell may be common to a class of players or unique to a single player. Some possible tells include leaning forward or back, placing chips with more or less force, fidgeting, doing chip tricks, displaying nervous tics or making any changes in one's breathing, tone of voice, facial expressions, direction of gaze or in one's actions with the cards, chips, cigarettes or drinks.

An underlying rule to many tells is: "weak means strong, strong means weak." Players who hold weak poker hands attempt to convince other players at the table that they are strong: staring down an opponent, throwing chips down forcefully into the pot in an effort to discourage others from calling. Players who hold strong hands tend to try to disguise their hand as being weak. They attempt to fly under the radar by being a passive player at the table - not making direct eye contact, softly tossing the chips in, being friendly and talkative. They are deliberately trying not to come across as intimidating, so as to entice a call.

== Online tells ==
Non-physical tells exist in both casino and online poker, but tells like speed of play, betting patterns, the quantity of chips that a player plays with, and player chat can be particularly revealing online.

== Reliability ==
A tell can only convey what the player thinks about the strength of their hand and what they think the other players have. Thus, perceiving a tell is useful only to the extent that the perceiver can pick up on enough of that information to come to a well-informed decision.

Sometimes other players may act in nervous or technologically incompetent ways that can make their competitors imagine a tell where none exists. These may include dropping chips seemingly expressively or out of clumsiness, betting the wrong amount by forgetting which chip is which, or accidentally clicking on the wrong thing online.

== See also ==
- Poker strategy
- Telegraph (sports)
- Microexpression
