= List of Viewtiful Joe episodes =

Covers of the eight DVD volumes released by Geneon Entertainment.

The following is a list of episodes for the anime series Viewtiful Joe. The series was directed by Takaaki Ishiyama and produced by Group TAC. The series ran for fifty-one episodes on TV Tokyo from October 2, 2004, to September 24, 2005. Based on the video game series of the same name, the anime tells the story of an action film fan named Joe who is thrust into the world of movies and given the ability to transform into the tokusatsu superhero Viewtiful Joe.

The series was licensed by Geneon Entertainment for broadcast and distribution in North America and by MGM Television for the rest of the world. An English dub, consisting of the first twenty-six episodes, aired on Kids' WB! from November 5, 2005, to May 20, 2006, beginning with the fifth episode. In Japan, the first twenty-six episodes were released on DVD by Suleputer in seven separate volumes between February 23, 2005, and July 27, 2005. In North America, those same episodes were released by Geneon in eight separate volumes between February 7, 2006, and April 3, 2007. The first three episodes were also released on UMD by Geneon. The show additionally received a release in Latin America, where its first thirty-six episodes were released on nine DVDs by Focus Filmes.

The show features four pieces of vocal music, including two openings and two endings. The openings, both by SaGa, are "Brighter Side" for the first thirty-eight episodes and "Spirit Awake" for the remaining episodes. The first ending is "And You" by SaGa for the first thirty-eight episodes, and the second is "Shangri-La Village / Tougenkyou" by Amasia Landscape for the remainder of the series.

Note that only the first twenty-six episode titles are official. The others, which were not broadcast in English, are direct translations of the Japanese titles.

== Season 1 ==
No.	Title	Original release date	U.S. airdate
1	"Just a Dude Named Joe"; Transliteration: "Sono Otoko Jō! No Maki" (Japanese: その男ジョー！の巻)	October 2, 2004	December 16, 2005
Film fan Joe and his girlfriend Silvia go on a date to a movie starring Joe's favorite action cinema star, Captain Blue. While watching the show, Silvia is kidnapped by literally being pulled through the screen and into the world of the movies. Joe is also pulled in, where he is forced to battle the minions of Jadow, the organization of villains responsible for Silvia's capture. Just as things begin to look bad for the protagonist, Captain Blue appears before Joe, granting him a special V-Watch which allows him to transform into a superhero in his own right. With his new powers, Joe pursues Jadow in an attempt to rescue his girlfriend.
2	"What's-His-Name to the Rescue!"; Transliteration: "Tsukame! Densetsu no Hissatsuwaza No Maki" (Japanese: つかめ！伝説の必殺技の巻)	October 9, 2004	December 16, 2005
As Silvia rides through the desert with her captor the ogre Hulk Davidson, she requests they stop so she can use the restroom. Hulk chooses to stop at the castle of the bat Charles III, another agent of Jadow. Joe manages to track the pair down, then enters the castle and engages Hulk in combat. While he appears to be no match for the giant ogre, Joe periodically recalls Captain Blue's special abilities from the hero's films. Joe defeats him and quickly ascends the castle stairs to meet Silvia, only to re-witness her capture, this time by Charles III himself, who flies out of the castle with her.
3	"Dude, Did You Say Viewtiful?"; Transliteration: "Ore wa, Byūteifuru Jō! No Maki" (Japanese: オレは、ビューティフル ジョー！の巻)	October 16, 2004	December 16, 2005
While contemplating a new name for himself, Joe is suddenly transported to a new part of Movieland, a place resembling a small desert island. Meanwhile, Charles III drops Silvia off in a new prison in a secluded portion of Movieland. The members of Jadow meet at their lair shortly thereafter, and it is decided that the shark Gran Bruce should be the next one to confront their new adversary Joe. Gran Bruce confronts and battles the superhero on the island, but despite an advantage over Joe due to the environment, the shark is defeated by pure luck. Right as the battle ends, the electrical demon Alastor appears. Joe quickly matches him in combat, causing Alastor to call the fighting skills of his new rival "viewtiful", which Joe then adopts into his new name "Viewtiful Joe". As Alastor departs, he mentions to Joe that Silvia's capture is necessary for Jadow's plans of world domination.
4	"Tutus To You, Too"; Transliteration: "Shiruvia SOS! No Maki" (Japanese: シルヴィアSOS！の巻)	October 23, 2004	December 23, 2005
A starving Joe makes his way to a city and tries unsuccessfully to find an open hamburger stand. Far away, Silvia, certain that Joe will rescue her, begins adjusting to life as Jadow's prisoner, using her charm to have a couple of Biankies cook delicious meals for her. The organization's Coordinator Sprocket slowly begins to break Silvia's spirit by showing her edited film reels of Joe's previous battles to make it appear her boyfriend is incapable of defeating Jadow's lackies. Sprocket then sends a group of Bianky-Primas to fight Viewtiful Joe in the city, which he easily dispatches. Sprocket has her guards create another edited film of Joe's battle, but is shocked to find Silvia watching an unedited copy of Joe's heroic victory, reaffirming the captive girl's hope for rescue.
5	"Howdy, Partner!"; Transliteration: "Tōjō! Kyaputen Burū Junia No Maki" (Japanese: 登場！キャプテン ブルー ジュニアの巻)	October 30, 2004	November 5, 2005
Joe makes his way to the wild west-like Blue Town, the hometown of the hero Captain Blue. There he witnesses a confrontation between a menacing biker gang and a young, aspiring hero named Captain Blue Junior, who claims to be the successor to Captain Blue. He and the townsfolk run the gang out of town. Joe introduces himself to Junior, who explains that he is waiting for his mentor's return so he can obtain a V-Watch and become a true hero. Fearing the boy's reaction, Joe keeps his own superhero identity and Captain Blue's fate to himself. The motorcycle gang returns with Bianco Billy, a Jadow gunfighter who swiftly overtakes the town and reveals Captain Blue's defeat to a distraught Junior. In regular fashion Viewtiful Joe arrives and trumps the town's invaders. As Joe says farewell to the town, Junior, after much thought, decides to join him on his adventure.
6	"Junior Sucks It Up"; Transliteration: "Kamōn! Shikkusumashin No Maki" (Japanese: カモ～ン！シックスマシンの巻)	November 6, 2004	November 12, 2005
Jadow formulates a plan to attack Viewtiful Joe from the skies, with Charles III taking charge of the mission. Joe and Junior make their way to another city, where Junior befriends a farmer named Syrus Brown. Later in the night, Charles III launches his assault on the heroes as planned. In desperation, Joe calls upon Machine Six, the robotic flying machine once owned by Captain Blue. Machine Six finds its way from Syrus' barn to its new master and helps the duo with the battle.
7	"Attack of the Slugoon Platoon"; Transliteration: "Kyōfu! Suragun Arawaru No Maki" (Japanese: 恐怖！スラグンあらわるの巻)	November 13, 2004	November 19, 2005
Joe and Junior scout out yet another town in search of Jadow. They are shown a sensational new product aimed at kids called a Slugoon, a slug-like creature worn on the head which allows the wearer to do almost anything when its given a verbal command. The town's children, as well as Junior, are eventually made victims of mind control while wearing the Slugoons, and quickly become violent against Joe and their parents. Joe cleverly convinces the villain controlling them to make the children stand up straight, causing the Sluggoons to fall off, and defeats him, saving the town.
8	"Fire on the Mountain"; Transliteration: "Eh, Hīrō Shikkaku!? No Maki" (Japanese: えっ、ヒーロー失格!? の巻)	November 20, 2004	November 26, 2005
On a mountainous area of Movieland, Joe and Junior encounter Jadow's Fire Leo, a lion with ability to harness fire. Curious of Silvia's attraction to her boyfriend, Alastor meets Joe during his battle with Leo. The demon gets the impression that Joe is an unconventional hero, offers Leo no help and leaves. Viewtiful Joe and Captain Blue Junior deftly outsmart Fire Leo in combat, and with his fire powers extinguished, the villain promptly retreats.
9	"Roamin' Holiday"; Transliteration: "Ōsōdō! Hīrō no Kyūjitsu No Maki" (Japanese: 大騒動！ヒーローの休日の巻)	November 27, 2004	December 3, 2005
10	"No Kidding"; Transliteration: "Sūpārobo! Guranchāruku No Maki" (Japanese: スーパーロボ！グランチャールクの巻)	December 4, 2004	December 10, 2005
Charles III, Hulk Davidson, and Gran Bruce create a seemingly-invincible robot, Gran Davidson III, to destroy Joe.
11	"When Pigments Fly"; Transliteration: "Sekai ga Shoku o Ushinau Nichi! No Maki" (Japanese: 世界が色を失う日！の巻)	December 11, 2004	December 17, 2005
12	"Dude, Where's My V-Watch?"; Transliteration: "Nerawa Reta Bui Wocchi! No Maki" (Japanese: 狙われたVウォッチ！の巻)	December 18, 2004	January 7, 2006
Joe has finally found Silvia, but she seems more interested in Joe's V-Watch than him. Sadly, "Silvia" is a shapeshifting Jadow agent sent to strip Joe of his V-Watch.
13	"The Fugitive From Beyond the Screen"; Transliteration: "Jadō kara no Tōbōsha! No Maki" (Japanese: ジャドーからの逃亡者！の巻)	December 25, 2004	January 14, 2006
14	"Jadow Greatest Hits Collection"; Transliteration: "Jitsuroku! Jadō Kareinaru Tatakai No Maki" (Japanese: 実録！ジャドー華麗なる戦いの巻)	January 8, 2005	January 21, 2006
15	"To Have and to Hold Captive"; Transliteration: "Shikumareta Wedinguberu! No Maki" (Japanese: 仕組まれたウェディングベル！の巻)	January 15, 2005	January 28, 2006
16	"A Fairy's Tale"; Transliteration: "Sakimasse! Yōsei no Hana No Maki" (Japanese: さきまっせ！妖精の花の巻)	January 22, 2005	February 4, 2006
17	"Captain Blue vs. The Squid of Inescapable Doom"; Transliteration: "Kaettekita Kyaputen Burū!? No Maki" (Japanese: 帰ってきたキャプテン ブルー!? の巻)	January 29, 2005	February 11, 2006
In order to cheer up a sick child, Joe and Alastor perform a series of mock-battles in costume, but Jadow's continued interference makes the performance difficult for them.
18	"V-Watch Out!"; Transliteration: "Bui Wocchi Panikku! No Maki" (Japanese: V-ウオッチパニック！の巻)	February 5, 2005	February 18, 2006
19	"V Is For Veggie-Burger?!"; Transliteration: "Kao Woagete Aruko U ! No Maki" (Japanese: 顔をあげて歩こう！の巻)	February 12, 2005	February 25, 2006
20	"Express Train to Yesterday"; Transliteration: "Asobi no Jikan wa Owara Nai! No Maki" (Japanese: 遊びの時間は終らない！の巻)	February 19, 2005	March 4, 2006
21	"Bianco Billy Rides Again"; Transliteration: "Junia Kiki Ippatsu! No Maki" (Japanese: ジュニア危機一発！の巻)	February 26, 2005	March 25, 2006
22	"Cleanliness is Next to Escape-liness"; Transliteration: "Shiruvia Daidassō!? No Maki" (Japanese: シルヴィア大脱走!? の巻)	March 5, 2005	April 22, 2006
Silvia stumbles onto a possible escape route from her captivity.
23	"Crush Hour"; Transliteration: "Gekitotsu ! Jō VS Arasutoru No Maki" (Japanese: 激突！ジョーVSアラストルの巻)	March 12, 2005	April 29, 2006
24	"Hero Takes a Fall"; Transliteration: "Fukkatsu! Shikkusu Majin No Maki" (Japanese: 復活！シックス魔人の巻)	March 19, 2005	May 6, 2006
25	"In the Belly of the Jadow Beast"; Transliteration: "Kessen! Jadō Kichi No Maki" (Japanese: 決戦！ジャドー基地の巻)	March 26, 2005	May 13, 2006
26	"It All Comes Down to a Dude Named Joe"; Transliteration: "Oretachi ni Ashita wa Aru! No Maki" (Japanese: 俺達に明日はある！の巻)	April 2, 2005	May 20, 2006
Joe confronts King Blue, a distraught Captain Blue, and tries to get him back on the side of good. After a classic battle of good and evil, Blue discovers Joe's support from his friends made him strong enough to beat him. Meanwhile, Silvia realizes Captain Blue is her very own father! After Blue reveals his collapse into depression and immersion into Movieland, Joe and Silvia forgive him. However, Silvia wants her father to give her a Henshin so she can be Joe's sidekick, and becomes Go-Go Silvia! Meanwhile, a mysterious U.F.O. descends from outer space...

== Season 2 (Japanese version only) ==
No.	Title	Original release date
27	"The New Enemy! Gedow's Invasion"; Transliteration: "Aratanaru Teki! Gedō Shūrai! No Maki" (Japanese: 新たなる敵！ゲドー襲来！の巻)	April 9, 2005
Back in the real world, Joe, Silvia, and Junior catch up with their idol, Captain Blue. Unfortunately, the good times end when they discover a film glowing ominously, and investigate the mystery inside. It turns out Blue's nemesis, the Black Emperor, leader of Gedow, has emerged to ruin the happy endings of movies, and he's also the one who gave Blue his trademark scar. After morphing Blue into a hammer, the Emperor proceeds to wreak a new brand of havoc onto Movieland.
28	"Junior's Transformation, Henshin a Yo-Yo"; Transliteration: "Junia, Henshin! No Maki" (Japanese: ジュニア、変身！の巻)	April 16, 2005
Gedow invades a dinosaur movie, where Dr. Cranken's android Miss Bloody Rachel uses the Blue Hammer to turn an innocent dinosaur into a combat-ready beast named Big John. As Joe and Silvia fend off John, Junior gains his own Henshin and joins the heroes. Meanwhile, Sprocket, Charles III, Hulk Davidson, and Gran Bruce find new work with Gedow.
29	"Silvia and the Woman Who Summons Storms!"; Transliteration: "Arashi o Yobu Onna Shiruvia! No Maki" (Japanese: 嵐を呼ぶ女シルヴィア！の巻)	April 23, 2005
In a movie heavily based on The Wizard of Oz, a robot named Doris has been corrupted by Gedow and is summoning tornadoes to devastate the film. As Joe and Junior try to calm the storm, Silvia crosses paths with a depowered Alastor (though she doesn't recognize him out of his armor).
30	"Wild Wild Kick!"; Transliteration: "Wairudo Wairudo Kikku! No Maki" (Japanese: ワイルド・ワイルド・キック！の巻)	April 30, 2005
Gedow has ruined a sports movie by making a children's soccer team so skilled that their coach has no reason to motivate them.
31	"The Alien Next Door"; Transliteration: "Kimi no Tonari ni Uchūjin! No Maki" (Japanese: キミの隣に宇宙人！の巻)	May 7, 2005
Gedow has turned a normally-peaceful group of transforming aliens into troublemakers. With help from a pair of familiar black-suited men (and Alastor), Joe must find a way to restore them.
32	"Fierceness! The Cannon Race"; Transliteration: "Mōretsu! Kyanon Rēsu No Maki" (Japanese: モーレツ！キャノンレースの巻)	May 14, 2005
It's a race through Movieland! In order to save this movie, Joe has to defeat Gedow's attempt to suck the passion out of all the racers.
33	"A Lot of Heroes!"; Transliteration: "Hīrō ga Ippai! No Maki" (Japanese: ヒーローがいっぱい！の巻)	May 21, 2005
Joe, Silvia, and Junior arrive in a superhero movie, where all the supervillains have vanished and the heroes are left struggling with each other for menial acts of rescue. Joe must find a way to bring the villains back, as a hero is nothing without their villains.
34	"Reclaiming the Black Diamond!"; Transliteration: "Burakkudaiya o Torimodose! No Maki" (Japanese: ブラックダイヤを取り戻せ！の巻)	May 28, 2005
Cameo Leon tries to pilfer an expensive black diamond to ruin the ending of a jewel heist movie, but the bombastic motormouth doesn't make it out the door without hearing from Joe and company.
35	"A Kind, Mysterious Person from Gedow?!"; Transliteration: "Gedō no Yasashii Kaijin!? No Maki" (Japanese: ゲドーのやさしい怪人!? の巻)	June 4, 2005
Rachel uses the Blue Hammer on a killer robot named ED-800, causing the robot to become friendly and peaceful. However, the people still run in fear of it, and so ED turns to Joe for help.
36	"The Target is Joe!"; Transliteration: "Tāgetto wa Jō! No Maki" (Japanese: 標的（ターゲット）はジョー！ の巻)	June 11, 2005
37	"Burning Metal Heart!"; Transliteration: "Moe yo Metaru Hāto! No Maki" (Japanese: 燃えよメタルハート！の巻)	June 18, 2005
38	"Revived Black Wings!"; Transliteration: "Yomigaeru Kuroi Tsubasa! No Maki" (Japanese: よみがえる黒い翼！の巻)	June 25, 2005
Alastor seeks to restore the lost power of his Devil Trigger form, his equivalent of Joe's Henshin transformation.
39	"Enemy is Captain Blue!"; Transliteration: "Teki wa Kyaputen Burū! No Maki" (Japanese: 敵はキャプテン ブルー！の巻)	July 2, 2005
40	"Movieland Crumbles!"; Transliteration: "Hōkai! Mūbīrando No Maki" (Japanese: 崩壊！ムービーランドの巻)	July 9, 2005
The Black Emperor's meddling with Movieland causes it to fissure apart.
41	"Courageously Engraving the Earth!"; Transliteration: "Daichi Nikizamu Yuuki! No Maki" (Japanese: 大地にきざむ勇気！の巻)	July 16, 2005
42	"Raw Hook-up! Joe VS Junior"; Transliteration: "Namachūkei! Jō VS Junia No Maki" (Japanese: 生中継！ジョーVSジュニアの巻)	July 23, 2005
43	"Sprocket's Love for Glasses!"; Transliteration: "Supuroketto wa Megane ga Osuki! No Maki" (Japanese: スプロケットはメガネがお好き！の巻)	July 30, 2005
44	"The Flaming Lion Returns!"; Transliteration: "Honō no Shishi Ritānzu! No Maki" (Japanese: 炎の獅子リターンズ！の巻)	August 6, 2005
When Joe and the gang meet an ice princess, they discover Fire Leo is with her, and has become more or less her knight in shining armor. However, Leo's furious brother, Frost Tiger, intends to tear down the princess's castle. Joe and Junior barge in to stop him from leveling the building, just before things really fall apart. Leo confronts his brother, who can't understand why he decided to be with the princess, and the two have a nasty battle that leaves the princess worried. Leo explains he can't be with her because of his superheated body, but she continues to fall for him, while Silvia jumps in to help the princess fight off Gedow. Fire Leo defeats Frost Tiger, but the aftermath causes his brother to fall down a cliff, and Fire Leo is unable to save him. Fire Leo is visibly hurt by the apparent demise of his brother, and feels like the princess should not be in love with a monster who does nothing but hurt those he cares about. The lion leaves into the unknown, causing the princess to shed a tear that becomes a snowflake.
45	"Gedow's Romantic Operation!"; Transliteration: "Gedō no Raburabu Daisakusen! No Maki" (Japanese: ゲドーのラブラブ大作戦！の巻)	August 13, 2005
46	"Rachel's Treasured Item"; Transliteration: "Reicheru no Takaramono! No Maki" (Japanese: レイチェルのたからもの！の巻)	August 20, 2005
Dr. Kranken disguises himself as a shopkeeper, and gives Rachel a heart so she can feel emotions. At first, it seems innocent enough, but the doctor's real plan is but to awaken the dark side of her. She eventually goes berserk, saying she hates Joe, leading to a showdown with Joe at a baseball field. Her evil side reveals anger for wanting the heart destroyed, but Rachel eventually surpasses the heart's evil, saying she can act on impulse and wants to be with Joe. She smashes it and sends it hurling back to Dr. Kranken in the shape of a baseball, with a home run swing from Joe. When wondering how his plan failed, Sprocket tells Kranken his heart doesn't understand emotion. Meanwhile, Alastor refuses to partake in anything but defeating Joe.
47	"Actual Records! Gedow's Battle is Confirmed!"; Transliteration: "Gedō kara no Tōbōsha! No Maki" (Japanese: ゲドーからの逃亡者！の巻)	August 27, 2005
48	"Fierce Battle! Eternal Rival!"; Transliteration: "Gekitō! Eien no Raibaru No Maki" (Japanese: 激闘！永遠のライバルの巻)	September 3, 2005
About to part ways for the last time with Joe as he and his friends get ready to depart from Movieland, Alastor decides to settle the score with his rival. It's his only chance left, knowing he must stay in this world where he belongs. Within the corridors of a malevolent mansion, Joe and Alastor battle for one final time, winner take all.
49	"Triumph! Gedow Destroyed"; Transliteration: "Daishōri! Gedō Kaimetsu No Maki" (Japanese: 大勝利！ゲドー壊滅の巻)	September 10, 2005
Joe and the crew, with the help of their old Jadow adversaries, cross back into the real world to topple the Black Emperor. However, it is going to be one of the toughest battles they have ever known.
50	"Exhibition! Viewtiful Film Festival"; Transliteration: "Kaisai! Byūtifuru Eigasai No Maki" (Japanese: 開催！ビューティフル映画祭の巻)	September 17, 2005
With the final battle seemingly over, everything in the real world has gone back to normal again, allowing Jet and Captain Blue to hold the Viewtiful Awards ceremony. After announcing the grand winner as the Black Emperor, however, Jet transforms into the Emperor. Blue explains his past to the group of heroes: how he fought the Black Emperor in his prime, the scar the Emperor etched along his helmet, and his close victory. The Black Emperor has planned to ruin the endings of every movie worldwide, leaving a sense of doom over the captive audience. He will use these feelings to feed his power and conquer the real world. With the energy of justice, not to mention the surprise help from Jet's conscious spirit, the Emperor is immobilized and forced to take the brunt of the heroic strike. Jet breaks free of the dark power inside, but moments later, it dumps out of his body in its true form. A monstrosity pops out of the theater, towering over skyscrapers- it the worst villain of all celluloid films: the Evil King.
51	"Tomorrow's Hero is You!"; Transliteration: "Ashita no Hīrō wa Kimi Da! No Maki" (Japanese: 明日のヒーローはキミだ！の巻)	September 24, 2005
Stripped of their powers by the Evil King's curtain of despair, Joe and his friends are left weak before a villain encompassing the world with dark power. Sylvia discovers a secret: the first piece of film her father used to animate Captain Blue is filled with the power of justice. Using the strength of Blue's "white film", "hope," Joe, Silvia, and Blue Jr. get their powers back tenfold and overcome the villain. Through the hopes and dreams of his friends, Joe channels their power into a Viewtiful Impact that destroys the monster, leaving only its heart. Blue realizes it was a monster that grew from the darkness in people's hearts, and it will continue to feed so long as despair keeps it alive. Uniting their strength of heroism, the group extinguishes it forever. The film festival resumes, and everyone returns to their usual lives; Jet and Blue are best friends and filmmakers once more, and Junior stars in a film of his very own, with Charles, Hulk, and Bruce getting to only be the comedic relief. As Joe and Sylvia leave the theater, kids approach them. They are fans of Joe and want to see him transform. Joe and Sylvia, joined by Junior, use the power of Henshin.
