= Music of the Ace Attorney series =

The Ace Attorney series of video games has had many soundtracks. This is a listing of this discography.

== Video game soundtracks ==
=== Gyakuten Saiban + Gyakuten Saiban 2 Original Soundtrack ===
Gyakuten Saiban + Gyakuten Saiban 2 Original Soundtrack

Soundtrack album by Masakazu Sugimori and Akemi Kimura
- Released: March 31, 2004
- Genre: Video game soundtrack
- Label: Suleputer
- Producer: Capcom

Masakazu Sugimori and Akemi Kimura chronology
| ''Gyakuten Saiban + Gyakuten Saiban 2 Original Soundtrack'' (2004) | Gyakuten Saiban Yomigaeru Gyakuten Original Soundtrack (2005) |

Gyakuten Saiban + Gyakuten Saiban 2 Original Soundtrack is a two-disc soundtrack album featuring music from the video game Gyakuten Saiban and Gyakuten Saiban 2 (known internationally as Phoenix Wright: Ace Attorney and Phoenix Wright: Ace Attorney – Justice for All respectively), composed and arranged by Masakazu Sugimori (Gyakuten Saiban) and Akemi Kimura (Gyakuten Saiban 2).

1. Phoenix Wright: Ace Attorney - Opening
2. Defendant Lobby - So it Begins
3. Phoenix Wright: Ace Attorney - Court is Now in Session
4. Cross-Examination - Moderato 2001
5. Tricks and Deductions
6. Phoenix Wright - Objection! 2001
7. Cross-Examination - Allegro 2001
8. Pursuit - Corner the Culprit
9. The Truth Revealed 2001
10. Suspense
11. Pursuit - Corner the Culprit (Variation)
12. Jingle - There's No Stopping Here
13. Initial Investigation 2001
14. Maya Fey - Turnabout Sisters 2001
15. Detention Center - The Security Guards' Elegy
16. Dick Gumshoe - That's "Detective Gumshoe," Pal!
17. Reminiscences - Maya's Sorrow
18. Marvin Grossberg - Reckonings and Regrets of an Aged Attorney
19. Simple Folk
20. Reminiscences - The Two Faces of a Studio
21. The Steel Samurai: Warrior of Neo Olde Tokyo
22. Reminiscences - The DL-6 Incident
23. Heart of the Investigation 2001
24. Reminiscences - The Class Trial
25. Victory! - Our First Win
26. Phoenix Wright: Ace Attorney - Ending
27. The Ballad of Turnabout Sisters
1. Justice for All - Opening (Toccata and Fugue in D minor, BWV 565 by J. S. Bach)
2. Ringtone (Richard Wellington)
3. Defendant Lobby - So it Begins Again
4. Justice for All - Court is Now in Session
5. Cross-Examination - Moderato 2002
6. Magic and Tricks
7. Phoenix Wright - Objection! 2002
8. Cross-Examination - Allegro 2002
9. Pursuit - Confront the Culprit
10. The Truth Revealed 2002
11. Ringtone (Phoenix Wright)
12. Pursuit - Confront the Culprit (Variation)
13. Jingle - There's No Sleeping Tonight
14. Psyche-Locks
15. Initial Investigation 2002
16. Maya Fey - Turnabout Sisters 2002
17. Detention Center - The Security Camera's Elegy
18. Kurain Village
19. Reminiscences - Fire-Licked Scars
20. Eccentrics
21. Fabulous!
22. Berry Big Circus
23. More Simple Folk
24. Reminiscences - Pure Pain
25. Shelly de Killer - A Deadly Gentleman's Delight
26. Pearl Fey - With Pearly
27. Further Investigation 2002
28. Triumphant Return - Miles Edgeworth
29. Hotline of Fate
30. Heart of the Investigation 2002
31. Reminiscences - Ballad of The Steel Samurai
32. Triumphant Return - Franziska von Karma
33. Victory! - Another Win
34. Justice for All - Ending
35. One Prosecutor's Musings - Until We Meet Again

=== Gyakuten Saiban 3 Original Soundtrack ===
Gyakuten Saiban 3 Original Soundtrack

Soundtrack album by Noriyuki Iwadare
- Released: March 31, 2004
- Genre: Video game soundtrack
- Length: 82:53
- Label: Suleputer
- Producer: Capcom

Noriyuki Iwadare chronology
| Gyakuten Saiban + Gyakuten Saiban 2 Original Soundtrack (2004) | ''Gyakuten Saiban 3 Original Soundtrack'' (2004) | Gyakuten Saiban Yomigaeru Gyakuten Original Soundtrack (2005) |

Gyakuten Saiban 3 Original Soundtrack is a soundtrack album featuring music from the Game Boy Advance version of the video game Gyakuten Saiban 3 (known internationally as Phoenix Wright: Ace Attorney – Trials and Tribulations), composed and arranged by Noriyuki Iwadare.

1. Trials and Tribulations - Opening
2. Defendant Lobby - So it Will Always Begin
3. Trials and Tribulations - Court is Now in Session
4. Cross-Examination - Moderato 2004
5. Phoenix Wright - Objection! 2004
6. Cross-Examination - Allegro 2004
7. Pursuit - Catch the Culprit
8. The Truth Revealed 2004
9. Pursuit - Catch the Culprit (Variation)
10. Dahlia Hawthorne - The Visage of What Once Was
11. Godot - The Fragrance of Darkness; That is Coffee
12. Jingle - There's No Going Back
13. Initial Investigation 2004
14. "The Stolen Turnabout"
15. Lordly Tailor
16. Detention Center - The Prisoner's Elegy
17. Mask☆DeMasque - Please Listen to Meeeee!
18. Luke Atmey - Look at Me
19. Larry Butz - When Something Smells, It's Usually Me
20. "Recipe for Turnabout"
21. Trés Bien
22. Victor Kudo - Martial Anthem of Misery
23. Furio Tigre - Swingin' Tiger
24. Reminiscences - Violetta Vitriol
25. "Turnabout Beginnings"
26. Reminiscences - The View from Dusky Bridge
27. Hazakura Temple
28. Elise Deauxnim - A Gentle Melody
29. Further Investigation 2004
30. Reminiscences - The Bitterness of Truth
31. Pursuit - Corner the Culprit 2004
32. Victory! - An Eternal Win
33. Trials and Tribulations - Ending
34. Ringtone (Godot)

=== Gyakuten Saiban Yomigaeru Gyakuten Original Soundtrack ===
Gyakuten Saiban Yomigaeru Gyakuten Original Soundtrack

Soundtrack album by Masakazu Sugimori and Akemi Kimura
- Released: November 30, 2005
- Genre: Video game soundtrack
- Length: 59:23
- Label: Suleputer
- Producer: Capcom

Masakazu Sugimori and Akemi Kimura chronology
| Gyakuten Saiban + Gyakuten Saiban 2 Original Soundtrack (2004) | ''Gyakuten Saiban Yomigaeru Gyakuten Original Soundtrack'' (2005) |

Gyakuten Saiban Yomigaeru Gyakuten Original Soundtrack (逆転裁判 蘇る逆転 オリジナル・サウンドトラック; lit. "Turnabout Trial: Revived Turnabout original soundtrack") is a soundtrack album featuring background music from the Nintendo DS version of the adventure video game Gyakuten Saiban (known internationally as Phoenix Wright: Ace Attorney), composed by Masakazu Sugimori and arranged by Akemi Kimura.

1. Phoenix Wright: Ace Attorney - Opening
2. Defendant Lobby - So it Begins
3. Phoenix Wright: Ace Attorney - Court is Now in Session
4. Cross-Examination - Moderato 2001
5. Tricks and Deductions
6. Phoenix Wright - Objection! 2001
7. Cross-Examination - Allegro 2001
8. Pursuit - Corner the Culprit
9. The Truth Revealed 2001
10. Suspense
11. Pursuit - Corner the Culprit (Variation)
12. Jingle - There's No Stopping Here
13. Initial Investigation 2001
14. Maya Fey - Turnabout Sisters 2001
15. Detention Center - The Security Guards' Elegy
16. Dick Gumshoe - That's "Detective Gumshoe," Pal!
17. Reminiscences - Maya's Sorrow
18. Marvin Grossberg - Reckonings and Regrets of an Aged Attorney
19. Simple Folk
20. Reminiscences - The Two Faces of a Studio
21. The Steel Samurai: Warrior of Neo Olde Tokyo
22. Reminiscences - The DL-6 Incident
23. Heart of the Investigation 2001
24. Reminiscences - The Class Trial
25. Victory! - Our First Win
26. Phoenix Wright: Ace Attorney - Ending
27. The Ballad of Turnabout Sisters
28. Rise from the Ashes - Opening
29. Reminiscences - The SL-9 Incident
30. Ema Skye - Turnabout Sisters 2005
31. The Blue Badger - I Want to Protect You
32. Jake Marshall - Renegade Sheriff
33. Damon Gant - Swimming, Anyone?
34. Rise from the Ashes - Ending
35. Ganto Kaiji Sketch Mishiyoukyoku

=== Gyakuten Saiban 4 Original Soundtrack ===
Gyakuten Saiban 4 Original Soundtrack

Soundtrack album by Toshihiko Horiyama
- Released: June 27, 2007
- Genre: Video game soundtrack
- Label: Suleputer
- Producer: Capcom

Gyakuten Saiban 4 Original Soundtrack is a soundtrack album featuring background music from the video game Gyakuten Saiban 4 (known internationally as Apollo Justice: Ace Attorney), composed and arranged by Toshihiko Horiyama.

1. Apollo Justice: Ace Attorney - Opening
2. Defendant Lobby - So it Begins Anew
3. Apollo Justice: Ace Attorney - Court is Now in Session
4. Cross-Examination - Moderato 2007
5. Trance-Deductions
6. Apollo Justice - A New Era Begins!
7. Cross-Examination - Allegro 2007
8. The Truth Revealed 2007
9. A Thrilling Theme - Suspense
10. Perceive - Laser-Focused Eyes
11. Pursuit - Gotta Corner the Culprit
12. Jingle - That's All for Today
13. Trucy's Theme - Child of Magic
14. Klavier Gavin - Guilty Love
15. Ema Skye - Science-Minded Detective
16. Initial Investigation 2007
17. Detention Center - Bittersweet Meetings
18. "Turnabout Corner"
19. Eccentrics 2007
20. The Foxy Kitaki Family
21. Ringtone (Guilty Love)
22. Reminiscences - Wounded Foxes
23. The Guitar’s Serenade
24. Troupe Gramarye
25. Reminiscences - Fates Smothered in Secrets and Schemes
26. Lamiroir - Landscape Painter in Sound
27. "Turnabout Succession"
28. Psyche-Locks 2007
29. Drew Studio
30. One Solitary Cell - Darkness
31. Heart of the Investigation 2007
32. Reminiscences - A Forgotten Legend
33. Victory! - A Win for Us
34. Apollo Justice: Ace Attorney - Ending

=== Gyakuten Kenji Original Soundtrack ===
Gyakuten Kenji Original Soundtrack

Soundtrack album by Noriyuki Iwadare and Yasuko Yamada
- Released: June 24, 2009
- Genre: Video game soundtrack
- Length: 114:33
- Label: Suleputer
- Producer: Capcom

The Gyakuten Kenji Original Soundtrack is a two-disc soundtrack album featuring background music from the video game Gyakuten Kenji (known internationally as Ace Attorney Investigations: Miles Edgeworth). Music is composed by Noriyuki Iwadare and Yasuko Yamada.

1. Gyakuten Kenji - Prologue
2. Investigation ~ Opening 2009
3. Investigation ~ Middlegame 2009
4. Investigation ~ Contradiction at the Crime Scene
5. Logic ~ The Way to the Truth
6. Investigation ~ Core 2009
7. Confrontation ~ Moderato 2009
8. Tricks and Gimmicks
9. Reiji Mitsurugi ~ Objection! 2009
10. Confrontation ~ Allegro 2009
11. Confess the Truth 2009
12. Tricks and Baroque
13. Confrontation ~ Presto 2009
14. Pursuit ~ Lying Coldly
15. Jingle ~ Slight Break
16. Mikumo Ichijo ~ The Great Truth Burglar
17. Shiryu Ro ~ Speak up, Pup!
18. Yatagarasu ~ The Gentleman Thief Who Dances in the Black Night
19. "Turnabout Airlines"
20. Zinc White ~ Time is Money
21. Wakana Shiraoto ~ Good Night
22. Doubted People
1. "Swept-Away Turnabout" ~ Overture to Kidnapping
2. Taiho-kun March ~ Bando Land Theme
3. "Swept-Away Turnabout" ~ Tragedy in the Horror House
4. Noisy People
5. Interesting People
6. Reminiscence ~ False Relations
7. Reproducing the Scene ~ The Gentleman Thief's Secret Weapon
8. Court ~ Guardians of the Law
9. "Departed Turnabout"
10. Ittetsu Bado ~ The Truth isn't Sweet
11. Himiko Kazura ~ Let Me Laugh at the Cool
12. Reminiscence ~ KG-8 Case
13. Crises of Fate
14. Keisuke Itonokogiri ~ I can do it when it counts, pal!
15. "Turnabout Up In Flames"
16. Two Embassies ~ The Lands of the Butterfly and the Flower
17. Reminiscence ~ Torn Apart Countries
18. Carnage Onred ~ The Enemy Who Surpasses the Law
19. Solution! ~ Splendid Deduction
20. Reiji Mitsurugi ~ Great Revival 2009
21. Prosecutor's Murmur ~ Promise to Meet Again

=== Gyakuten Kenji 2 Original Soundtrack ===
Gyakuten Kenji 2 Original Soundtrack

Soundtrack album by Noriyuki Iwadare
- Released: February 28, 2011
- Genre: Video game soundtrack
- Length: 133:24
- Label: Suleputer
- Producer: Capcom

Noriyuki Iwadare chronology
| Gyakuten Kenji Original Soundtrack (2009) | ''Gyakuten Kenji 2 Original Soundtrack'' (2011) |

The Gyakuten Kenji 2 Original Soundtrack is a two-disc soundtrack album featuring background music from the video game Ace Attorney Investigations 2: Prosecutor's Gambit, sequel to Ace Attorney Investigations: Miles Edgeworth. The game's music was composed by Noriyuki Iwadare, composer of Trials and Tribulations and the first Ace Attorney Investigations.

1. Gyakuten Kenji 2 ~ Prologue
2. Investigation ~ Opening 2011
3. Logic ~ Truth of the Crime Scene
4. Trick Analyze
5. Logic Chess ~ Opening
6. Confrontation ~ Moderato 2011
7. Reiji Mitsurugi ~ Objection! 2011
8. Confess the Truth 2011
9. Jingle ~ Neverending Trouble
10. The Imprisoned Turnabout
11. Investigation ~ Middlegame 2011
12. Tateyuki Shigaraki ~ Joking Motive
13. Yumihiko Ichiyanagi ~ Ichiryuu's Reasoning
14. Confrontation ~ Allegro 2011
15. Hakari Mikagami ~ Goddess of Law
16. Prosecutorial Investigation Committee ~ Rigorous Justice
17. Lamenting People
18. Strange People
19. Reproducing the Scene ~ The Gentleman Thief's Secret Weapon 2011
20. Investigation ~ Core 2011
21. Marie Miwa ~ Hug and Kiss
22. Ryouken Houinbou ~ Tone of an Assassin
23. Confrontation ~ Presto 2011
24. Pursuit ~ Wanting to Find the Truth
1. The Inherited Turnabout
2. Shin Mitsurugi ~ A Defense Attorney's Knowledge
3. Issei Tenkai ~ Sweet Happiness
4. Restless People
5. Reminiscence ~ IS-7 Incident
6. Trick Break
7. Tsukasa Oyashiki ~ Sweet Dance
8. Yutaka Kazami ~ Brandished Flavor
9. The Forgotten Turnabout
10. Trifle of Fate
11. Reminiscence ~ The Girl's Lost Memories
12. Bonds ~ A Heart That Believes
13. The Grand Turnabout
14. Shimon Aizawa ~ Pointed Age
15. The Great Monster Borumosu
16. Reminiscence ~ The Fall of the House of Lang
17. Logic Chess ~ Endgame
18. Yumihiko Ichiyanagi ~ Ichiryuu's Farewell
19. Ringtone ~ Hakari Mikagami
20. Zheng Fa ~ Land of the Phoenix
21. Reminiscence ~ SS-5 Incident
22. The Man who Masterminds the Game
23. Solution! ~ Calm Moment
24. Prosecutor's Murmur ~ Each One's Path
25. Gyakuten Kenji 2 ~ Great Revival

=== Gyakuten Saiban Sound Box ===
Gyakuten Saiban Sound Box

Soundtrack album by Masakazu Sugimori, Akemi Kimura, and Noriyuki Iwadare
- Released: February 8, 2012
- Genre: Video game soundtrack
- Length: 183:11
- Label: Suleputer
- Producer: Capcom

The Gyakuten Saiban Sound Box is a three-disc compilation soundtrack, containing the music from Gyakuten Saiban, Gyakuten Saiban 2, and Gyakuten Saiban 3 with enhanced sound quality. All music is directly from the WiiWare releases of each game.

Gyakuten Saiban (Disc One)

1. Gyakuten Saiban - Prologue
2. Courtroom Lounge ~ Beginning Prelude
3. Gyakuten Saiban - Court Begins
4. Cross Examination ~ Moderato 2001
5. Logic and Trick
6. Naruhodou Ryuuichi ~ Objection! 2001
7. Cross Examination ~ Allegro 2001
8. Pursuit ~ Cornered
9. Confess the Truth 2001
10. Suspense
11. Pursuit ~ Cornered / Variation
12. Jingle ~ It Can't End Here
13. Investigation ~ Opening 2001
14. Ayasato Mayoi ~ Gyakuten Sisters' Theme 2001
15. Detention Center ~ Jailer's Elegy
16. Itonokogiri Keisuke ~ Detective Itonoko, Pal
17. Reminiscence ~ Heartbroken Mayoi
18. Hoshikage Soranosuke ~ Age, Regret, Retribution
19. Congratulations, Everyone
20. Reminiscence ~ Light and Shadow of the Film Studio
21. Warrior of Great Edo, Tonosaman
22. Reminiscence ~ Case DL-6
23. Investigation ~ Core 2001
24. Reminiscence ~ School Trial
25. Won the Case! ~ First Victory
26. Gyakuten Saiban - End
27. Gyakuten Sisters' Ballad
28. Yomigaeru Gyakuten - Prologue
29. Reminiscence ~ Case SL-9
30. Houdzuki Akane ~ Gyakuten Sisters' Theme 2005
31. Taiho-kun ~ I Want to Protect
32. Zaimon Kyousuke ~ A Detective Without a Desert
33. Ganto Kaiji ~ Swimming, Anyone?
34. Yomigaeru Gyakuten - End

Gyakuten Saiban 2 (Disc Two)

1. Gyakuten Saiban 2 - Prologue
2. Ringtone / Moroheiya Takamasa
3. Courtroom Lounge ~ Another Prelude
4. Gyakuten Saiban 2 - Court Begins
5. Cross Examination ~ Moderato 2002
6. Trick and Magic
7. Naruhodou Ryuuichi ~ Objection! 2002
8. Cross Examination ~ Allegro 2002
9. Pursuit ~ Questioned
10. Confess the Truth 2002
11. Ringtone / Naruhodou Ryuuichi
12. Pursuit ~ Questioned / Variation
13. Jingle ~ Can't Sleep on a Night Like This
14. Lock on the Heart (Psycho Lock)
15. Investigation ~ Opening 2002
16. Ayasato Mayoi ~ Gyakuten Sisters' Theme 2002
17. Detention Center ~ Security Camera Elegy
18. Village of Kurain
19. Reminiscence ~ Scars Carved by Fire
20. Eccentric
21. Gorgeous!
22. Tachimi Circus
23. Congratulations Again, Everyone.
24. Reminiscence ~ True Pain
25. Koroshiya Sazaemon ~ The Whim of a Murderous Gentleman
26. Ayasato Harumi ~ With Hami-chan
27. Investigation ~ Middle 2002
28. Great Revival ~ Mitsurugi Reiji
29. Hotline to Destiny
30. Investigation ~ Core 2002
31. Reminiscence ~ Tonosaman Ballad
32. Great Revival ~ Karuma Mei
33. Won the Case! ~ Another Victory
34. Gyakuten Saiban 2 - End
35. Prosecutor's Murmur ~ Until We Meet Again

Gyakuten Saiban 3 (Disc Three)

1. Gyakuten Saiban 3 - Prologue
2. Courtroom Lounge ~ Unending Prelude
3. Gyakuten Saiban 3 - Court Begins
4. Cross Examination ~ Moderato 2004
5. Naruhodou Ryuuichi ~ Objection! 2004
6. Cross Examination ~ Allegro 2004
7. Pursuit ~ Caught
8. Confess The Truth 2004
9. Pursuit ~ Caught / Variation
10. Miyanagi Chinami ~ Distant Traces
11. Godot ~ The Fragrance of Dark Coffee
12. Jingle ~ Can't Go Back to Those Days
13. Investigation ~ Opening 2004
14. "Stolen Turnabout"
15. Takabisha Department Store
16. Detention Center ~ Elegy of the Detained
17. The Phantom Kamen Mask ~ Please Listen!
18. Hoshiidake Aiga ~ I Just Want Love
19. Yahari Masashi ~ When Something Smells, it's Always Me
20. "Turnabout Recipe"
21. Trés Bien
22. Igarashi Shouhei ~ A Painful Declaration and War Song
23. Shibakuzou Toranosuke ~ Swinging Zenitora
24. Reminiscence ~ I Blame You
25. "Beginning Turnabout."
26. Reminiscence ~ Shadow on Oboro Bridge
27. Hazakurain
28. Tenryuusai Elise ~ Gentle Melody
29. Investigation ~ Middle 2004
30. Reminiscence ~ The Bitter Taste of Truth
31. Pursuit ~ Cornered 2004
32. Won the Case! Unending Victory.
33. Gyakuten Saiban 3 - End
34. Ringtone / Godot

=== Gyakuten Saiban 5 Original Soundtrack ===
Gyakuten Saiban 5 Original Soundtrack

Soundtrack album by Noriyuki Iwadare
- Released: September 25, 2013
- Genre: Video game soundtrack
- Length: 143:12
- Label: Suleputer
- Producer: Capcom

The Gyakuten Saiban 5 Soundtrack is a two-disc soundtrack featuring the background music from Gyakuten Saiban 5 (known internationally as Phoenix Wright: Ace Attorney - Dual Destinies). The game's music is composed by Noriyuki Iwadare, composer of Trials and Tribulations, Ace Attorney Investigations, and Ace Attorney Investigations 2.

1. Gyakuten Saiban 5 - Prologue
2. Courtroom Lobby ~ Prelude to the Future
3. Gyakuten Saiban 5 - Court Begins
4. Cross Examination ~ Moderato 2013
5. Logic Trinity
6. "The Depths of the Depths of the Heart"
7. Naruhodou Ryuuichi ~ Objection! 2013
8. "Odoroki Attacked"
9. Cross Examination ~ Allegro 2013
10. Suspense 2013
11. Pursuit ~ Keep Pressing On
12. Confess the Truth 2013
13. "Breakaway"
14. Jingle ~ You Should Rest at a Time Like This
15. "Turnabout Youkai Parade"
16. Kyuubi Village ~ Home of the Youkai
17. Mysterious! The Legend of Tenma Tarou
18. Go Forth! Great Kyuubi
19. "The Murder Committed by a Youkai"
20. Minuki's Theme ~ Child of Magic 2013
21. Kizuki Kokone ~ Let's Do This!
22. Ban Gouzou ~ Our Secret Word is Justice!
23. Investigation ~ Opening 2013
24. Detention Center ~ Elegy of the Bulletproof Glass
25. Shuuichi Biyouin ~ I Am Biyouin
26. "A Prosecutor with Handcuffs"
27. Yuugami Jin ~ Distorted Swordsmanship
28. Odoroki Housuke ~ A New Chapter of Trials 2013
29. Thought Route ~ Synaptic Resonance
30. "Turnabout Academy"
31. Private School Themis Law School ~ Our Precious School
32. "Kokone Will Take on Your Defense"
33. Lively People
34. Suspicious People
35. Difficult People
36. Housuke Odoroki ~ I’m Fine!
37. Heart Scope ~ Commence the Psychological Analysis!
38. Running Wild · Heart Scope ~ Get A Grip On Yourself
39. "Proof of Friendship"
40. Reminiscence ~ Wandering Heart
41. Kizuki Kokone ~ Bringer of Revolution
42. "Garyuu Wave · Twilight Gig"
1. "Turnabout up to the Stars"
2. Oogawara Uchuu ~ Head of the Center of the Universe
3. Robot Laboratory ~ Unerasable Past
4. "Turnabout to the Future"
5. Investigation ~ Examination
6. Ayasato Harumi ~ With Hami-chan 2013
7. Chains of the Heart ~ Psyche-Lock 2013
8. "A Magnificent Visitor"
9. Mitsurugi Reiji ~ Great Revival 2013
10. Reminiscence ~ Tragic Memories
11. Investigation ~ Core 2013
12. Illegality of Fate
13. "For Those I Will Protect"
14. The Dark Age of Law
15. Phantom ~ UNKNOWN
16. Pursuit ~ Keep Pressing On (Variation)
17. Won the Case! ~ Everyone’s Victory
18. Gyakuten Saiban 5 ~ End
19. "Countdown to the Future"
20. "Turnabout Great Pirates"
21. Arafune Aquarium ~ A Refreshing Sea
22. Pirate Sisters Ales ~ Adventures Across the Seven Seas
23. "Pirate Show Song" ~ The Sea Of Adventure is Here
24. "Pirate Show Song" ~ The Writer Who Snatches Away the Truth
25. Reminiscence ~ Departure from Regret
26. Pursuit ~ Demo PV version (Bonus Track)
27. Pursuit ~ Last Promotion Version (Bonus Track)

=== Reiton-kyōju vs Gyakuten Saiban Mahō Ongaku Taizen ===
Reiton-kyōju vs Gyakuten Saiban Mahō Ongaku Taizen

Soundtrack album by Tomohito Nishiura and Yasumasa Kitagawa
- Released: April 10, 2013
- Genre: Video game soundtrack
- Length: 175:04
- Label: Suleputer
- Producers: Capcom, Level-5

Reiton-kyōju vs Gyakuten Saiban Mahō Ongaku Taizen is a three-disc soundtrack album featuring music from the video game Reiton-kyōju vs Gyakuten Saiban (known internationally as Professor Layton vs. Phoenix Wright: Ace Attorney), a crossover between the Professor Layton and Ace Attorney video game series. The music was composed and arranged by Yasumasa Kitagawa and Professor Layton series composer Tomohito Nishiura; in addition to original compositions, the soundtrack features arrangements of tracks from Gyakuten Saiban originally composed by Masakazu Sugimori.

1. THE OPENING THEME OF "PROFESSOR LAYTON VS GYAKUTEN SAIBAN"
2. About Town ~ VS Arrange ver.
3. Puzzles 8
4. A Strange Story ~ VS Arrange ver.
5. Labyrinth City
6. Pinch! ~ VS Arrange ver.
7. A Calm Afternoon ~ VS Arrange ver.
8. An Uneasy Atmosphere ~ VS Arrange ver.
9. Forest
10. Suspicion ~ VS Arrange ver.
11. The Lost Forest ~ VS Arrange ver.
12. Ink Workshop
13. Barrom
14. The Town's History ~ VS Arrange ver.
15. Professor Layton's Theme 1 ~ VS Arrange ver.
16. The City at Night
17. A Quiet Time ~ VS Arrange ver.
18. Suspense ~ VS Arrange ver.
19. Mahoney's Theme ~ Memory
20. Puzzles 6 ~ VS Arrange ver.
21. Reunion
22. The Professor's Deductions ~ VS Arrange ver.
23. LINK
24. The Buried Ruins
25. Audience
26. Tension ~ VS Arrange ver.
27. The Storyteller's Tower
28. Puzzles 5 ~ VS Arrange ver.
29. The Hidden Garden
1. Courtroom Lobby ~ Beginning Overture
2. Gyakuten Saiban - Trial
3. Suspense
4. Logic and Trick
5. Cross Examination ~ Moderato
6. Ryuuichi Naruhodou ~ Objection!
7. Cross-Examination ~ Allegro
8. Tell the Truth
9. Pursuit ~Cornered
10. Victory! ~The First Victory
11. In the Dark ~The Witches' Overture
12. Witch Trial - Trial
13. The Stake's Witnesses
14. Jeeken Barnrod ~ Labyrinth Knight
15. Mob Cross-Examination ~ Moderato
16. Logic and Baroque
17. Straying ~Suspense
18. Ryuichi Naruhodo ~ Objection! 2012
19. Mob Cross-Examination ~ Allegro
20. Tell the Truth 2012
21. Theme of the United Front
22. The Courtroom's Magician
23. Recollection ~ Bewitched Fate
24. Farce ~Naive People
25. Recollection ~ Golden Revelation
26. Mist Belduke ~ Twilight Memories
27. The Great Witch's Judgment - Trial
28. Omen ~Footfals of Turnabout
29. The Ruler and the Alchemist
30. Seal ~Locked-Away "Darkness"
31. Recollection ~ The Legendary Great Fire
32. Pursuit ~ Casting Magic
33. The Final Witness
34. Turnabout Sisters' Theme ~ Music Box ver.
1. The Witches' Theme ~ Chase
2. RAINY NIGHT
3. In-Flight
4. OPENING
5. The Witches' Theme ~ Assault
6. Escape
7. THE MAGIC BOOK
8. That Case
9. The Storyteller's Theme ~ Parade
10. Judgment ~ Witch Trial
11. A Mysterious Fire
12. The Bell Tower's Arrival
13. Sorrowful Golden Statue
14. Rescue and Retribution
15. A Familiar Face
16. Into the Ruins
17. A Faint Voice
18. Garyuu ~ Roar
19. Confrontation
20. Confrontation ~ The Titanic Knights
21. Professor Layton's Theme 2 ~ VS Arrange ver.
22. Festival
23. Sealed Memories
24. Garyuu ~ Creation
25. Mahoney's Theme ~ Truth
26. Lostoria!!
27. The Light of the Truth
28. PRELUDE
29. DENOUEMENT
30. THE ENDING THEME OF "PROFESSOR LAYTON VS GYAKUTEN SAIBAN"

==== Charts ====
| Chart (2013) | Peak position |
|---|---|
| Japan (Oricon) | 128 |

== Arranged soundtracks ==
Noriyuki Iwadare has created two discs and has arranged two live performances that use tracks from the Ace Attorney series, but performed with instruments from multiple genres.

=== Gyakuten Meets Orchestra ===
Gyakuten Meets Orchestra

Soundtrack album by Noriyuki Iwadare
- Released: September 30, 2006
- Genre: Video game soundtrack
- Label: Suleputer
- Producer: Capcom

Noriyuki Iwadare chronology
| ''Gyakuten Meets Orchestra'' (2006) | Gyakuten Meets Jazz Soul (2007) |

Gyakuten Meets Orchestra is a soundtrack album featuring orchestral arrangements of background music from the first three entries in the Ace Attorney video game series, with one additional track from the as-of-then unreleased fourth entry.

1. Naruhodou Ryuuichi - Objection!
2. Ayasato Mayoi - Theme of Gyakuten Sisters
3. Mitsurugi Reiji - Great Revival
4. Investigation - Labyrinth Suite
5. Gyakuten Saiban Court Suite
6. Warrior of Great Edo, Tonosaman
7. Gyakuten Saiban 2 Court Suite
8. Godot - Fragrance of Dark Coffee
9. Gyakuten Saiban 3 Court Suite
10. Kurain Genealogy
11. Gyakuten Saiban 3 Epilogue
12. Odoroki Housuke - Start of a New Trial!

=== Gyakuten Meets Jazz Soul ===
Gyakuten Meets Jazz Soul

Soundtrack album by Noriyuki Iwadare
- Released: March 31, 2007
- Genre: Jazz soul
- Label: Suleputer
- Producer: Capcom

Noriyuki Iwadare chronology
| Gyakuten Meets Orchestra (2006) | ''Gyakuten Meets Jazz Soul'' (2007) | Gyakuten Saiban Tokubetsu Hōtei 2008 (Spring) (2008) |

Gyakuten Meets Jazz Soul (also known as Turnabout Jazz Soul) is a soundtrack album featuring jazz arrangements of background music from the first three entries in the Ace Attorney video game series, with one additional track from the as-of-then unreleased fourth entry.

1. Gyakuten Saiban ~ Court Begins Blue note scale
2. Naruhodou Ryuuichi ~ Objection!
3. Warrior of Great Edo, Tonosaman
4. Gyakuten Saiban 2 ~ Court Begins Blue note scale
5. Mitsurugi Reiji - Great Revival
6. Shibakuzou Toranosuke ~ Swinging Zenitora
7. Gyakuten Saiban 3 ~ Court Begins Blue note scale
8. Godot ~ The Fragrance of Dark Coffee
9. Yomigaeru Gyakuten - End
10. Minuki ~ Magical Child

=== Gyakuten Saiban Tokubetsu Hōtei 2008 ===
Gyakuten Saiban Tokubetsu Hōtei 2008

Soundtrack album by Noriyuki Iwadare
- Released: July 16, 2008
- Genre: Video game soundtrack
- Length: 1:03:03
- Label: Suleputer
- Producer: Capcom

Noriyuki Iwadare chronology
| Gyakuten Meets Jazz Soul (2007) | ''Gyakuten Saiban Tokubetsu Hōtei 2008'' (2008) | Gyakuten Saiban Tokubetsu Hōtei 2008 Autumn Commemorative (2008) |

Gyakuten Saiban Tokubetsu Hōtei 2008 (『逆転裁判』特別法廷2008 オーケストラコンサート; lit. "Turnabout Trial: Special Tribunal Orchestra Concert 2008") is a soundtrack album featuring background music from the video game series Ace Attorney that was performed live by the Tokyo Philharmonic Orchestra in spring. A DVD of this concert was released on October 30, 2008.

1. Housuke Odoroki ~ A New Trial is in Session!
2. Gyakuten Saiban 1~3 Courtroom Suite
3. Toranosuke Shibakuzou ~ Swingin' Zenitora
4. Godot ~ The Fragrance of Dark-Colored Coffee
5. Great Revival ~ Reiji Mitsurugi
6. Gyakuten Saiban 4 Courtroom Suite
7. Villain Suite
8. Loving Guitar's Serenade
9. Mayoi Ayasato ~ Gyakuten Sisters' Theme
10. Gyakuten Saiban 3 - End
11. Oo-edo Soldier Tonosaman's Song
12. Ryuuichi Naruhodou ~ Objection!

=== Gyakuten Saiban Tokubetsu Hōtei 2008 Autumn Commemorative ===
Gyakuten Saiban Tokubetsu Hōtei 2008 Autumn Commemorative

Soundtrack album by Noriyuki Iwadare
- Released: September 23, 2008
- Genre: Video game soundtrack
- Length: 17:10
- Label: Suleputer
- Producer: Capcom

Noriyuki Iwadare chronology
| Gyakuten Saiban Tokubetsu Hōtei 2008 (2008) | ''Gyakuten Saiban Tokubetsu Hōtei 2008 Autumn Commemorative'' (2008) | Gyakuten Kenji Orchestra & Video Album (2009) |

Gyakuten Saiban Tokubetsu Hōtei 2008 Autumn Commemorative (『逆転裁判』特別法廷2008 オーケストラコンサート; lit. "Turnabout Trial: Special Tribunal Orchestra Concert 2008") is a soundtrack album featuring background music from the video game series Ace Attorney that was given to attendees of the autumn orchestral concert.

1. Loving Guitar's Serenade
2. Oo-edo Soldier Tonosaman's Song
3. Ryuuichi Naruhodou ~ Objection! (Kanadeon ver.)
4. Taiho-kun ~ I Want to Protect (Kanadeon ver.)

=== Gyakuten Kenji Orchestra & Video Album ===
Gyakuten Kenji Orchestra & Video Album

Soundtrack album by Noriyuki Iwadare
- Released: May 28, 2009
- Genre: Video game soundtrack
- Length: 20:56
- Label: Suleputer
- Producer: Capcom

Noriyuki Iwadare chronology
| Gyakuten Saiban Tokubetsu Hōtei 2008 Autumn Commemorative (2008) | ''Gyakuten Kenji Orchestra & Video Album'' (2009) | Gyakuten Kenji 2 Orchestra Arrangement Collection (2011) |

Gyakuten Kenji Orchestra & Video Album is a soundtrack album featuring background music from and based on music from the Ace Attorney series related to the character Miles Edgeworth. The album was released with a special limited edition of Gyakuten Kenji.

1. Mitsurugi Reiji ~ Great Revival 2009
2. Testimony ~ Lying Coldly Full Orchestra Arrange
3. Investigation Suite
4. Taiho-kun ~ I Want to Protect
5. Mitsurugi Reiji ~ Great Revival Kanadeon Version

=== Gyakuten Kenji 2 Orchestra Arrangement Collection: Kanaderareshi Gyakuten ===
Gyakuten Kenji 2 Orchestra Arrangement Collection: Kanaderareshi Gyakuten

Soundtrack album by Noriyuki Iwadare
- Released: February 3, 2011
- Genre: Video game soundtrack
- Length: 48:30
- Label: Suleputer
- Producer: Capcom

Noriyuki Iwadare chronology
| Gyakuten Kenji Orchestra Mini Album (2008) | ''Gyakuten Kenji 2 Orchestra Arrangement Collection: Kanaderareshi Gyakuten'' (2011) |

Gyakuten Kenji 2 Orchestra Arrangement Collection: Kanaderareshi Gyakuten is a soundtrack album featuring background music from and based on music from the Ace Attorney series related to the character Miles Edgeworth, this time, from his second game as main character, Gyakuten Kenji 2. It consists of orchestral arrangements of various themes from the game's soundtrack. The album was released with a special limited edition of Gyakuten Kenji 2.

1. Mitsurugi Reiji ~ Objection! 2011
2. Mikumo Ichijo ~ The Great Truth Burglar 2011
3. Gyakuten Kenji 2 Investigation Suite
4. Gyakuten Kenji 2 Logic Suite
5. Hakari Mikagami ~ Goddess of Law
6. Gyakuten Kenji 2 Confrontation Suite
7. Pursuit ~ Wanting to Find the Truth
8. Shin Mitsurugi ~ A Defense Attorney's Knowledge
9. Bonds ~ A Heart that Believes
10. Gyakuten Kenji 2 ~ Great Revival
11. Opening ~ Gyakuten Kenji 2

=== Gyakuten Saiban Movie Original Soundtrack ===
Gyakuten Saiban Movie Original Soundtrack

Soundtrack album by Kōji Endō and Masakazu Sugimori
- Released: February 3, 2012
- Genre: Film soundtrack
- Length: 60:55
- Label: VAP
- Producer: Capcom

Gyakuten Saiban Original Movie Soundtrack is a soundtrack album featuring the music from the theatrical movie Gyakuten Saiban.

1. Gyakuten Saiban - Trial (Cinema Ver.)
2. Ryuichi Naruhodo ~ Objection 2001 (Cinema Ver.)
3. Cross Examination ~ Allegro 2001 (Cinema Ver.)
4. Negligence
5. Attachment Order
6. Breaking Into a Residence
7. Imprisonment With Work
8. Aggravated Escape
9. Suspension of Execution of the Sentence
10. Necessary Measure
11. Evidence
12. Testify Associate Judge
13. Upper Instance Court
14. Kidnapping
15. Attempts
16. Youth
17. General Period for Payment
18. Investigation ~ Core 2001 (Cinema Ver.)
19. Mayoi Ayasato ~ Turnabout Sisters Theme 2001 (Diva Ver.)
20. Pursuit ~ Cornered (Cinema Ver.)
21. Fine
22. Article 30
23. Neighboring Right
24. Acceptance of Stolen Property
25. Robbery
26. Insults
27. Gambling
28. Arson of Inhabited Buildings
29. Theft
30. Obstruction to Flood Prevention
31. Unjust Enrichment
32. Fanfare
33. BWV245 (BACH)
34. Oo-edo Soldier Tonosaman (Cinema Ver.)
35. Mayoi Ayasato ~ Turnabout Sisters Theme 2001 (Choir Ver.)

=== Gyakuten Saiban 15th Anniversary Orchestra Concert ===
Gyakuten Saiban 15th Anniversary Orchestra Concert

Soundtrack album by Noriyuki Iwadare
- Released: September 13, 2017
- Genre: Video game soundtrack
- Length: 91:00
- Label: Harmonics Music

Gyakuten Saiban 15th Anniversary Orchestra Concert is a soundtrack album consisting of 13 tracks of music from the Ace Attorney series arranged for orchestra. The recordings are taken from the concert celebrating the 15th anniversary of the series held at the Tokyo Bunka Kaikan on May 6, 2017 and performed live by the Tokyo Philharmonic Orchestra.
