= Suleputer =

Japanese record label

Suleputer (セルピュータ) is a record label the Japanese game development company Capcom uses for its releases. Its name derives from the full name of Capcom: "(CAP)(SULE) (COM)(PUTER)(S)".

== Select discography ==
- Biohazard 2 ReMIX ~met@morPhoses~ (1997)
- Marvel vs. Capcom: Clash of Super Heroes Original Soundtrack (1998)
- Biohazard 2 Original Soundtrack (1998)
- Biohazard: Symphony Op. 91: Crime and Punishment (1998)
- Biohazard 2 Complete Track (1998)
- Biohazard Orchestra (1999)
- Biohazard Code: Veronica Original Soundtrack (2000)
- Great Mahou Daisakusen Original Soundtrack (2000)
- Dino Crisis 2 Original Soundtrack (2000)
- Biohazard Code: Veronica Complete Original Soundtrack (2001)
- Capcom Music Generation Family Computer Soundtracks Rockman 1~6 (2002)
- STREET FIGHTER Tribute Album (2003)
- Dino Crisis 3 Original Soundtrack (2003)
- Viewtiful Joe + Viewtiful Joe 2 Original Soundtrack (2004)
- Rockman Zero Complete Game Music Collection: Rockman Zero 1-3 (2004)
- Biohazard Sound Chronicle (2005)
- Biohazard 4 Original Soundtrack (2005)
- Gyakuten Saiban Yomigaeru Gyakuten Original Soundtrack (2005)
- Makaimura Music Collection (2005)
- Ōkami Original Soundtrack (2006)
- Goku Makaimura Original Soundtrack (2006)
- Breath of Fire Original Soundtrack Special Box (2006)
- Ōkami Piano Arrange (2007)
- Dead Rising Original Soundtrack (2007)
- Gyakuten Saiban Tokubetsu Hōtei 2008 (2008)
- Biohazard 5 Original Soundtrack (2009)
- Ghost Trick Original Sound Track (2010)
- E.X. Troopers The Bounded Soundtrack (2012)

== See also ==
- List of record labels
